= 2023 visit by Xi Jinping to Russia =

2023 meeting between China and Russia's leaders

- Part of China–Russia relations, Russo-Ukrainian War
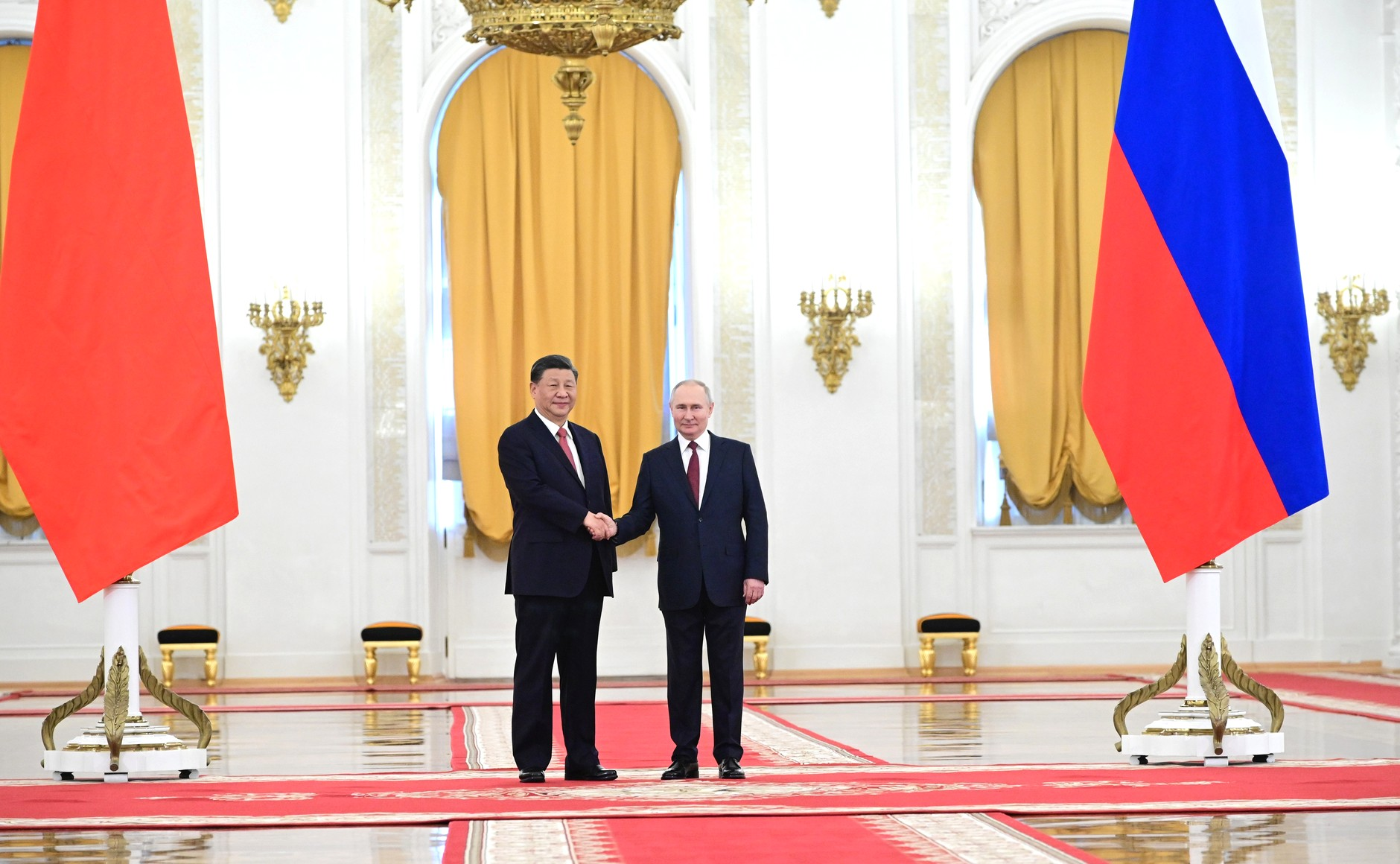
- Putin welcomes Xi to Moscow, 21 March 2023
- Date: 20–22 March 2023
- Location: Moscow, Russia
- Participants: Xi Jinping; Vladimir Putin

On 20–22 March 2023, Xi Jinping, general secretary of the Chinese Communist Party and Chinese president, visited Russia, in his first international meeting since his re-election as president during the 2023 National People's Congress.

During the talks, the two sides signed a joint statement. The two sides stated that they should strengthen overall design and top-level planning, expand trade in energy, resources and electromechanical products, enhance the resilience of the industrial chain supply chain between the two sides, expand cooperation in the fields of information technology, digital economy, agriculture and trade in services, and push forward the complementary and synchronized development of cooperation in traditional trade and emerging fields, as well as further smoothening cross-border logistics and transportation. Xi said he has a peace plan for Ukraine.

== Background ==
A few weeks before Xi's visit, China issued a paper outlining its positions regarding de-escalation and political settlement of the Russo-Ukrainian war. The visit came just days after China won a major diplomatic victory, bringing Iran and Saudi Arabia closer together and restoring their diplomatic relations.

Hours after it was announced that Xi Jinping would visit Russia, the International Criminal Court issued a warrant to arrest Vladimir Putin.

Prior to the visit, Xi Jinping and Vladimir Putin published separate articles; Xi said China's proposal to end the Russo-Ukrainian War reflected world opinion. Putin said he had high hopes for the visit of his "good old friend." Wang Wenbin, the spokesman for the Ministry of Foreign Affairs, described Xi Jinping's visit to Russia as a "friendship tour", "cooperation tour" and "peace tour" at a regular press conference. He will also exchange views on international and regional issues of concern to both countries and promote strategic collaboration and cooperation.

== Visit ==
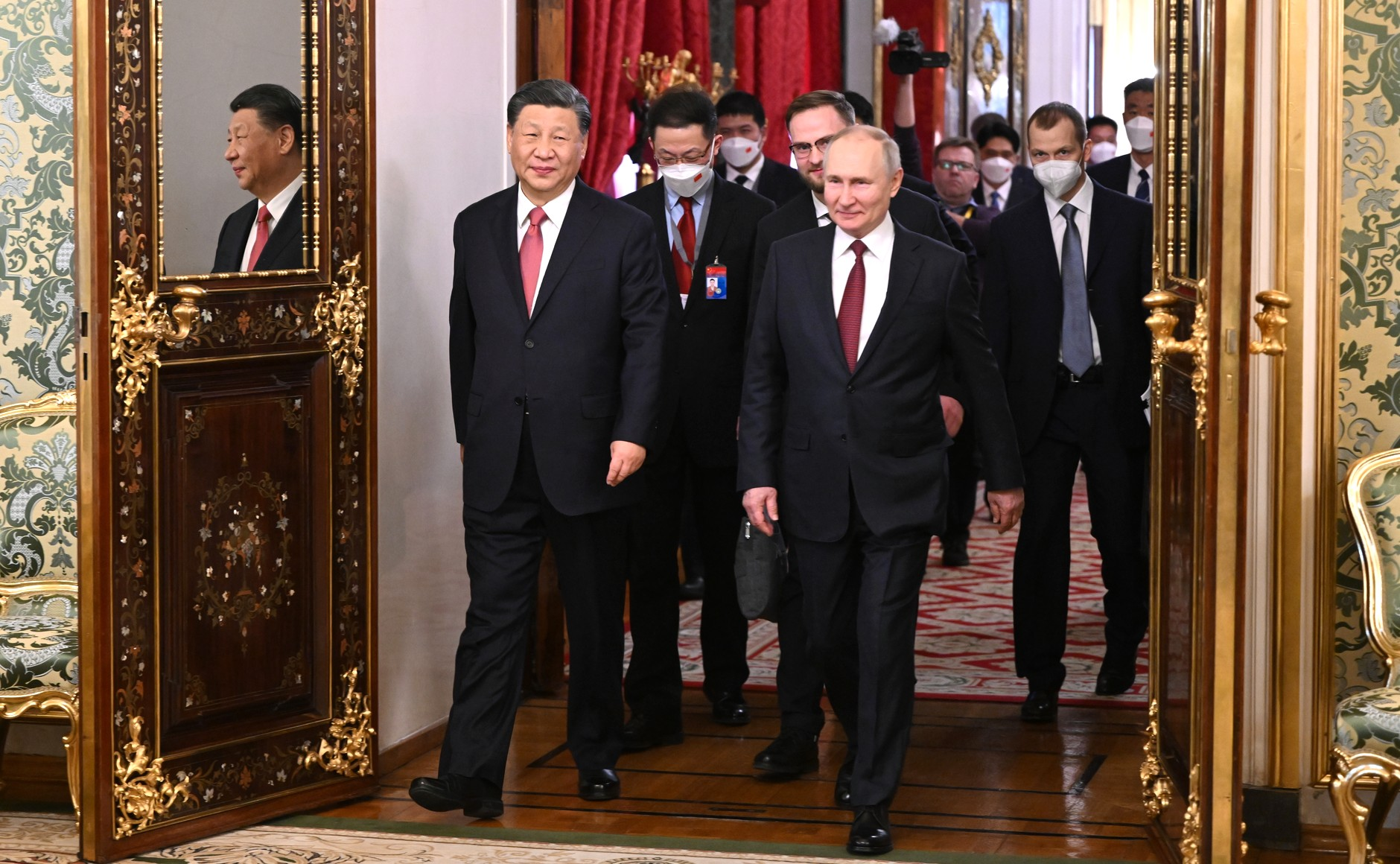
Xi Jinping and Vladimir Putin before the beginning of Russian-Chinese talks on March 21, 2023

On the morning of March 20, 2023, President Xi Jinping arrived at Moscow's Vnukovo International Airport on a special plane and was greeted by Deputy Prime Minister of the Russian Federation Dmitry Chernyshenko. Chinese officials, including Cai Qi, Wang Yi, and Qin Gang, accompanied him on the visit.

In the afternoon, President Xi, who has just arrived in Moscow, met with Russian president Vladimir Putin at the Kremlin. The two heads of state had in-depth and frank exchanges on China–Russia relations, national development, and issues of common concern in Ukraine. During Xi Jinping's visit, Vladimir Putin said Russia is ready to discuss China's initiative for ending the conflict in Ukraine, adding that he had looked at China's proposals for a resolution of the Ukraine conflict and that he viewed them with respect.

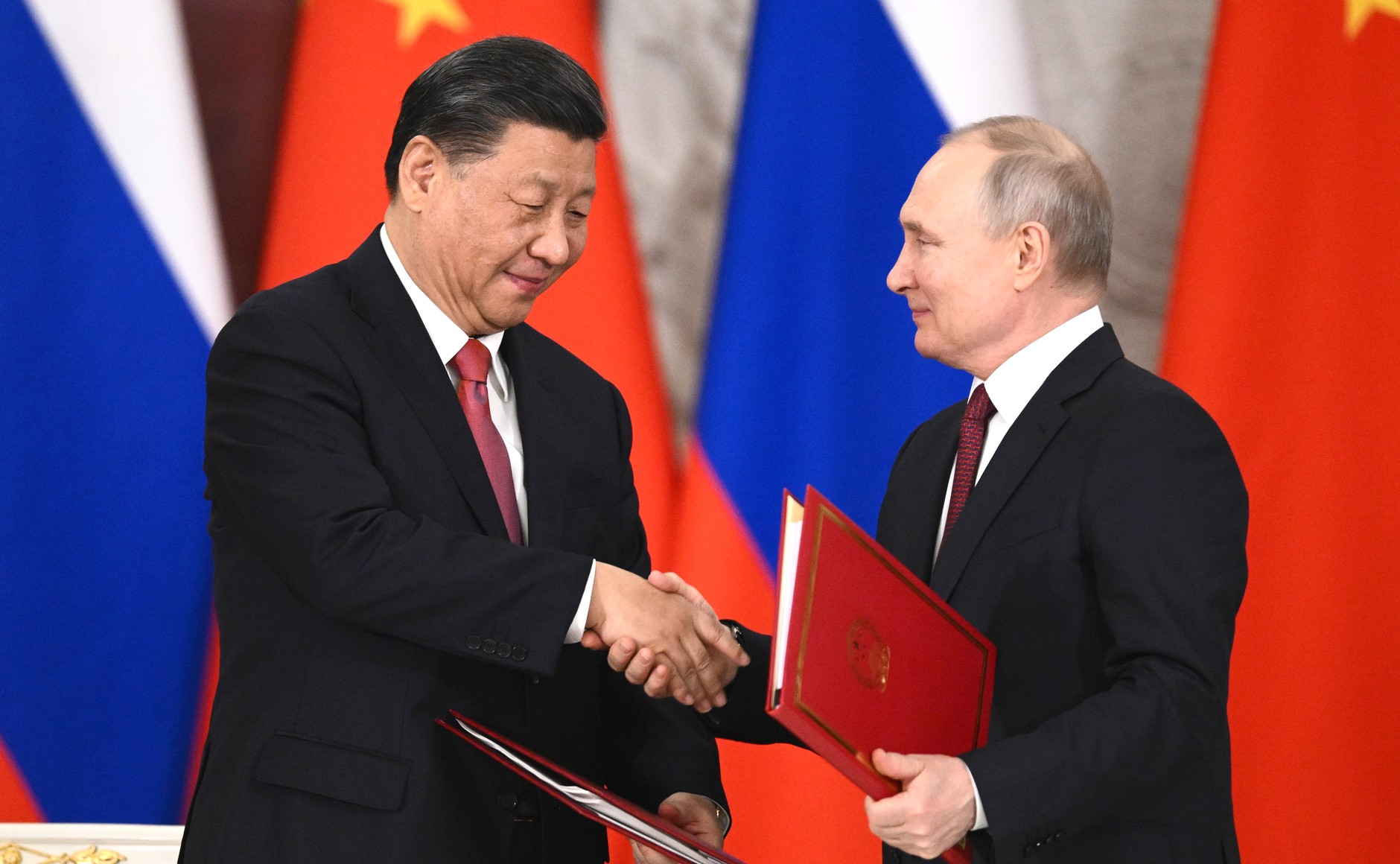
Russia and China signed the package of documents

On the morning of March 21, President Xi met with Russian prime minister Mikhail Mishustin at the Government House of the Russian Federation. On the afternoon of March 21, Xi Jinping held an official meeting with Vladimir Putin. Following the meeting, Xi Jinping and Putin signed the Joint Declaration of the People's Republic of China and the Russian Federation on the Deepening of Comprehensive Strategic Collaboration and Partnership for the New Era and the president of the People's Republic of China and the president of the Russian Federation on the Development Plan of Priority Directions of China-Russia Economic Cooperation for the Period up to 2030. During the visit, the two sides also signed a number of bilateral cooperation documents in the fields of agriculture, forestry, basic scientific research, market regulation and media.

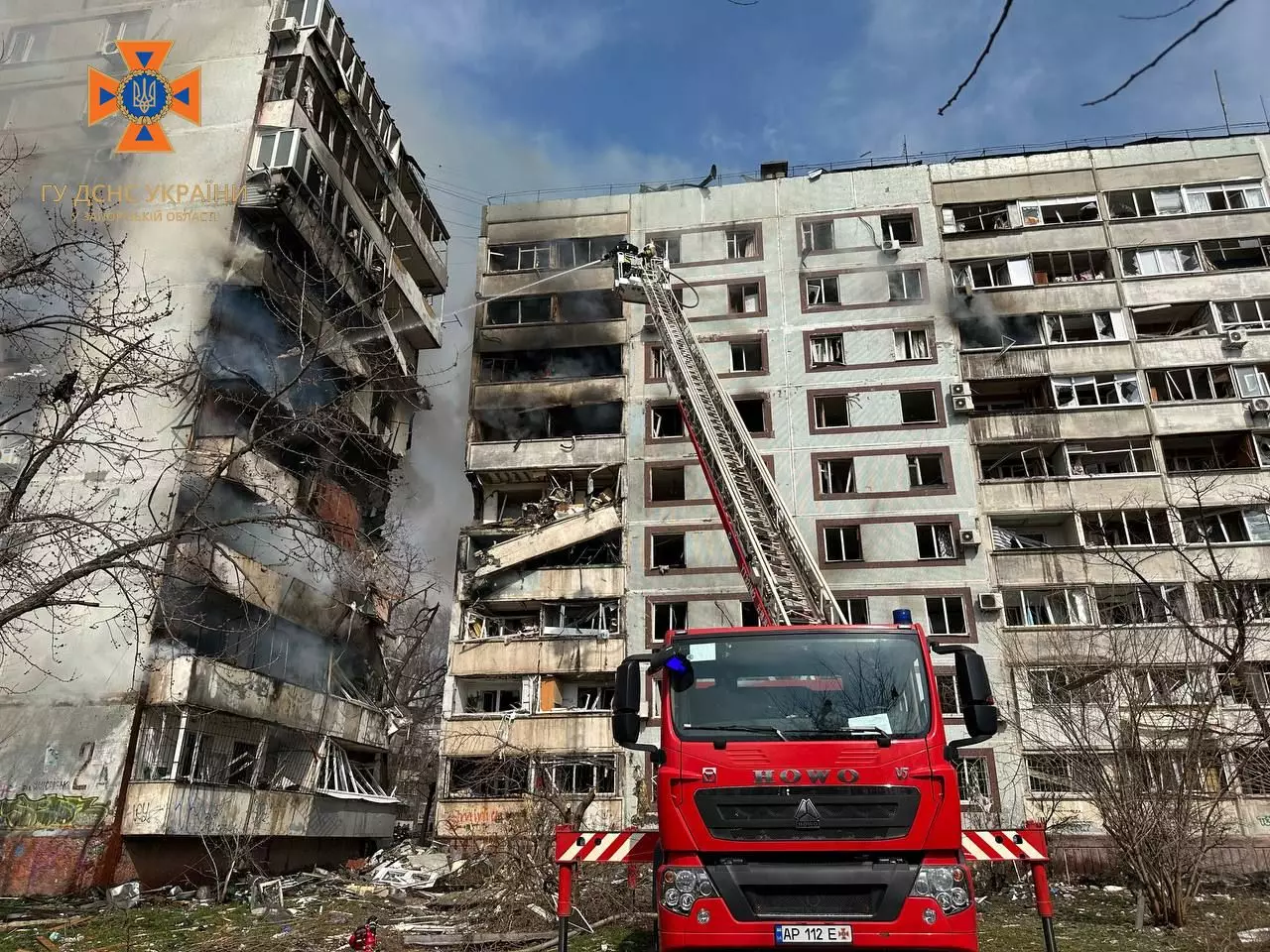
Residential buildings in Zaporizhzhia after Russian rocket strikes on 22 March 2023, the second day of Xi's visit to Moscow

On the morning of March 22, President Xi left Moscow from Vnukovo International Airport on an Air China special flight, Russian Deputy Prime Minister Chernyshenko and other high-ranking government officials were at the airport to see them off and held a grand send-off ceremony. The Russian military band played the Chinese military song "When That Day Comes" to see him off. Xi and his entourage returned to Beijing on the evening of March 22, Beijing time.

== Reception ==
Xi Jinping's meeting with Putin was seen as PR victory for the Russian president amidst his increasing isolation. For China, the meeting served as a symbolic gesture of Beijing's refusal to conform to American dominance. Putin and Xi called each other "dear friends" and their body language was amicable. Putin praised the plan and blamed Ukraine and the West for rejecting it, while Xi Jinping avoided mentioning the conflict, refusing to make his stance clear.

== Reactions ==
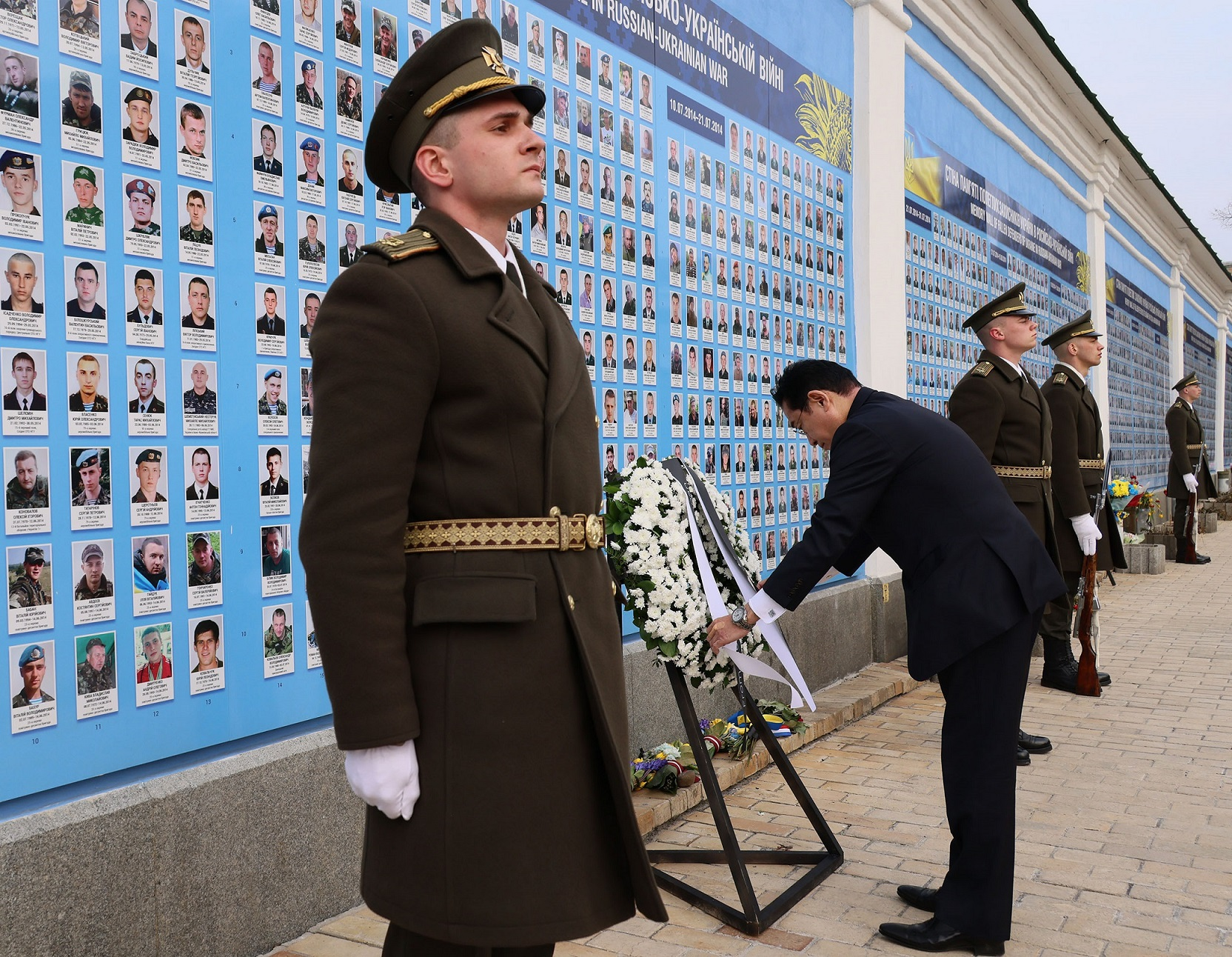
Fumio Kishida at The Wall of Remembrance of the Fallen for Ukraine near Mykhailivska Square in Kyiv on 21 March 2023

On the same day as this event, Japanese prime minister Fumio Kishida visited Volodymyr Zelenskyy in Kyiv and visited Bucha, the site of the 2022 massacre. Kishida also stated that Russia's aggression against Ukraine is not just a European matter, but a challenge to the rules and principles of the entire international community.

Valentina Matviyenko, Chair of the Federation Council, posted, "President Xi Jinping's trip is an epoch-making event in Russia-China bilateral relations. The visit proves the stability of high-level strategic collaboration between Russia and China."

Polish prime minister Mateusz Morawiecki expressed concern about a "dangerous" China-Russian alliance.

== See also ==
- 2024 visit by Vladimir Putin to China
- China–Russia relations
- China and the Russian invasion of Ukraine
- List of international trips made by Xi Jinping
- 2023 visit by Fumio Kishida to Ukraine
