= Lazar Brodsky =

Russian businessman (1848–1904)

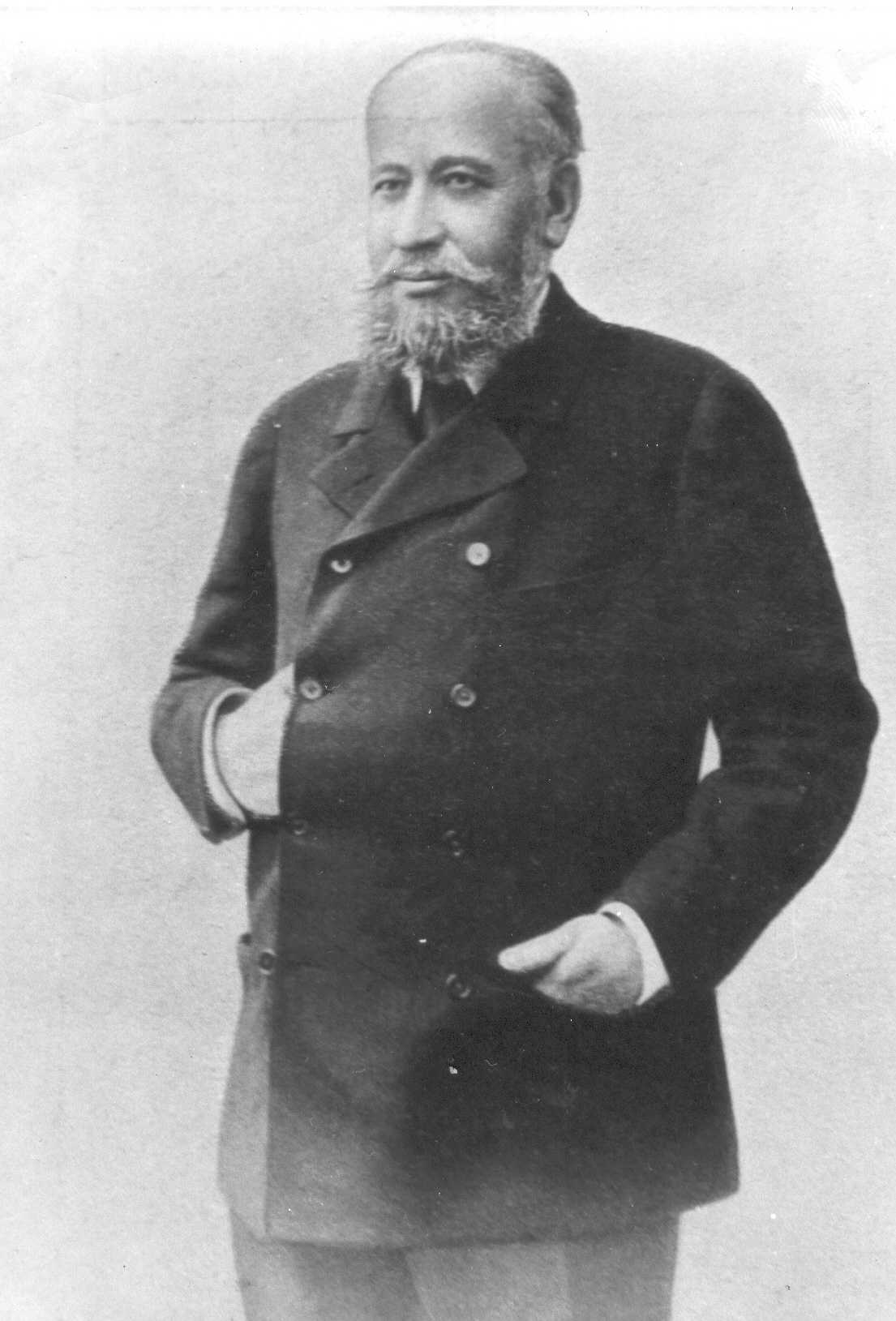
- Born: Lazar Izrayilevich Brodsky; September 7 [O.S. August 26] 1848; Zlatopol, Russian Empire (now Ukraine)
- Died: October 2 [O.S. September 19] 1904; Basel, Switzerland
- Citizenship: Russian Empire
- Occupations: Sugar industrialist; philanthropist
- Spouse: Sara Lurie
- Children: Maria, Vera, Klara, Margarita

Lazar Izrayilevich Brodsky (Russian: Ла́зарь Изра́илевич Бро́дский; Ukrainian: Ла́зар Ізраїльович Бро́дський; Hebrew: אליעזר ברודסקי; September 7 [O.S. August 26] 1848 – October 2 [O.S. September 19] 1904) was a Russian businessman of Jewish origin, sugar magnate, philanthropist and patron.

== Early life ==
Lazar Brodsky was born in Zlatopol, a shtetl in Kiev Governorate of the Russian Empire (modern-day Ukraine), in the family of Jewish entrepreneur Israel Brodsky. Together with his brother Lev (Leon) he inherited his father's very successful sugar production business. He headed Alexandria Society of Sugar Mills, which controlled more than one-fourth of the total sugar production in the Russian Empire.

== Career ==
He was a member of the board of the Saint Petersburg International Commercial Bank, director of the board of the Kiev water facilities association, managing director and member of the board of the Society of the steam-powered flour mills, founder and the chairman of the board of the Second Steamship Company on the Dnieper River, Member of the Kiev Mutual Credit Society.

Lazar Brodsky was widely known as a philanthropist. He financed the Jewish hospital in Kiev and Jewish schools. He financed the construction of the biggest synagogue in Kyiv, which later was named after him. The building was constructed in 1897–1898, on Brodsky's estate.

Other city institutions established with his funds were the Bacteriological Institute and the Besarabsky Market. He was the initiator and one of the sponsors of the construction of the Polytechnic Institute in Kiev.

Lazar Brodsky supported the development of the tramway communications in Kiev.

Brodsky also donated 75,000 rubles to the Institute of Experimental Medicine in St. Petersburg.

== Death ==
Lazar Brodsky died on September 19, 1904, from diabetes mellitus in Basel, on September 24; his body was brought to Kiev and the same day the funeral was organized at the Choral Synagogue. Brodsky was buried in a marble tomb at Lukyanovka Jewish cemetery (the tomb has not survived); best people of the city attended the ceremony, including the governor, the mayor commander, and the mayor. According to Kiev newspapers, about 150 wreaths was sent for the funeral, ten of them were made of silver.

Lazar Brodsky had four daughters but no sons. After his death, his brother Leo inherited the dynasty.

== Legacy ==
Brodsky appears as a character in some of Sholem Aleichem's stories, embodying the aspirational wealth and status Sholem Aleichem observed and even desired, as seen in his quote, "Ah, if only one day I might become a Brodsky!".

== Awards and regalia ==
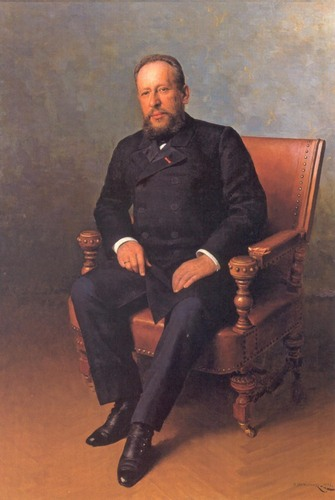
Portrait of Lazar Brodsky by Mykola Pymonenko

In 1900, at the Universal Exhibition in Paris, Brodsky received the French Legion of Honor for the high quality of the goods produced at his plants.

He was also a recipient of the Order of St. Vladimir.

== Buildings donated to Kiev ==
- Besarabsky Market, Bessarabska Square
- Kiev Polytechnic Institute
- E. O. Paton Electric Welding Institute
- Kiev Regional Hospital
- Bacteriological Institute
- Brodsky Mill
- Mansion at Institutska street
- Brodsky Choral Synagogue
- Theatre of Operetta
