= Philip Klein (rabbi) =

Hungarian-born New York rabbi

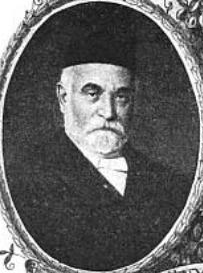
- Born: May 22, 1849; Baracska, Hungary
- Died: March 21, 1926 (aged 76); New York, New York, US
- Education: University of Vienna; Hildesheimer Rabbinical Seminary; University of Berlin
- Occupation: Rabbi
- Spouse: Julie Hirsch (m. 1881)

Philip Hillel Klein (May 22, 1849 – March 21, 1926), also known as Hillel HaKohen Klein, was a prominent Hungarian-born American Orthodox rabbi who served as the spiritual leader of the First Hungarian Congregation Ohab Zedek for thirty-five years. Renowned as a bridge between traditional European scholarship and the acculturating American Jewish community, he held numerous leadership positions, including the presidency of Agudath Israel of America and the honorary presidency of the Union of Orthodox Rabbis (Agudat ha-Rabbanim). He was frequently referred to by Hungarian-American Jews as the "Chasam Sofer of America".

== Early life ==
Klein was born in Baracska, Hungary, the son of Hermann (Zev Zvi) Klein, a student of the Chasam Sofer. From a young age, Klein demonstrated extraordinary intellectual abilities; by the age of eleven, he reportedly knew the entire Tanach (Hebrew Bible) by heart and was conversant in the Seder Nezikin of the Talmud.

At age twelve, he enrolled in the Pressburg Yeshiva, studying under Rabbi Avraham Shmuel Binyomin Sofer (the Ksav Sofer). After four years, he moved to Eisenstadt to study with Rabbi Ezriel Hildesheimer, who pioneered a model of education that combined sacred studies with secular subjects like mathematics and classical languages. Klein’s aptitude was so significant that within a year of his arrival, he was tasked with delivering a daily lecture to thirty junior students.

== Academic and European career ==
Seeking to balance his religious training with secular knowledge, Klein moved to Vienna in 1868, where he attended the Gymnasium and later the University of Vienna. During this time, he delivered daily Gemara classes at the Schiffshul. When Rabbi Hildesheimer moved to Berlin to establish his own seminary, Klein followed his mentor.

In 1871, at the age of twenty-one, Klein received rabbinical ordination from Rabbi Benjamin Hirsch Auerbach of Halberstadt. Two years later, in 1873, he earned a Ph.D. from the University of Berlin, a rare credential for an Orthodox rabbi of that era.

In 1874, Klein moved to Kiev to serve as a private tutor for the son of Israel Brodsky, a prominent religious sugar industrialist. During his five years there, he became deeply familiar with the leading rabbis of Russia and Lithuania. In 1880, he accepted the rabbinate of Libau, Latvia, where he was exceptionally permitted to serve in the dual capacity of both "rav" (religious authority) and "rabbi" (government-recognized leader) due to his university credentials.

== Ministry in America and Ohab Zedek ==
Rabbi Klein immigrated to the United States in 1891, driven by rising anti-Semitism in the Russian Empire and an invitation from New York's Chief Rabbi Jacob Joseph, who required an assistant. Klein was appointed the spiritual leader of Congregation Ohab Zedek, then located on the Lower East Side at 172 Norfolk Street.

As the congregation grew more acculturated, Klein oversaw its move to Harlem in 1909 and eventually to the Upper West Side in 1926. He delivered his sermons in classical German, which eventually became difficult for the younger generation to understand. Consequently, the congregation hired Rabbi Bernard Drachman, an American-born, English-speaking rabbi, to serve as Klein's colleague and deliver sermons in English. Together, they established Ohab Zedek as a premier institution for middle-class, acculturated Orthodox Jews.

== Communal and Organizational Leadership ==
Klein was a central figure in the organization of American Orthodoxy. He was a founding member and president of the Union of Orthodox Rabbis (Agudat ha-Rabbanim) in 1902, an organization intended to centralize rabbinic authority, particularly in the areas of kashrut and Sabbath observance. His leadership extended to several major national and international bodies:

- Agudath Israel of America: He served as the president of the newly founded American branch.
- Ezras Torah Fund: He was a founder and served as treasurer for ten years, helping to support European Torah scholars during and after World War I.
- Rabbi Isaac Elchanan Theological Seminary (RIETS): Klein served as the president of the yeshiva from 1902 to 1908. He was instrumental in launching the building campaign that secured the institution's first permanent building on the Lower East Side and formed the first Semicha Board in 1906.
- Kashrut and Labor Ethics: Klein actively mediated labor disputes, such as the 1892 shochtim strike and the 1911 matzo bakers strike. He signed declarations concerning kashrut alongside the Chief Rabbi as "Hillel HaKohen hamechuneh Doctor Klein".

== Relief Work and Zionism ==
Following the outbreak of World War I in 1914, Rabbi Klein and Harris Masliansky made the first public appeal for aid to war-stricken European Jews from the pulpit of Ohab Zedek. This led to the formation of the Central Relief Committee (CRC), which prioritized aid to Orthodox institutions and scholars in Galicia and Hungary.

Though affiliated with the Old Yishuv and the Kolel Shomrei Hachomos in Jerusalem, for which he served as president (Nasi), Klein remained a staunch supporter of traditional religious life in Eretz Yisrael. He maintained a vast correspondence to ensure funds reached the community directly.

== Personal life ==
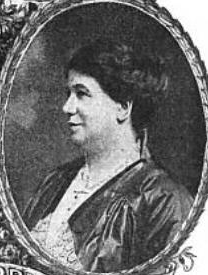
Julie Hirsch Klein

In 1881, Klein married Julie (Gella) Hirsch, daughter of educator Mendel Hirsch and granddaughter of Rabbi Samson Raphael Hirsch of Frankfurt. Julie Klein was a leader in her own right, serving as vice-president of the Women's Branch of the Union of Orthodox Jewish Congregations and honorary president of the Sisterhood of Congregation Ohab Zedek. She conducted a Talmud Torah on the Lower East Side for over 200 children, and organized the Julie Hirsch Klein Benevolent Society. The couple suffered significant family tragedies, losing three children to illness during their youth. The oldest two daughters, Sarah and Hannah, had died in 1904, and another son, Herman, had died at three from scarlet fever in Libau. Their remaining children were Leo, Samson, Marcus, David, Raphael, Emanuel, Mrs. Harriet Lunzer, and Elizabeth.

== Death ==
Rabbi Philip Klein died on March 21, 1926, at the age of 77. As per his last wishes, his body wasn't taken to a synagogue during his funeral and no eulogies were made. His death was a major event in New York Jewish life; three hundred rabbis headed a funeral procession that drew thousands to the streets. He is buried in Washington Cemetery in Brooklyn. Remarkably, his wife Julie died of pneumonia only forty-eight hours later, without learning of her husband's passing.
