= Metrohrad Shopping Mall =

Mall in Ukraine

Coordinates: 50°26′27″N 30°31′11″E

Metrohrad
- Метроград
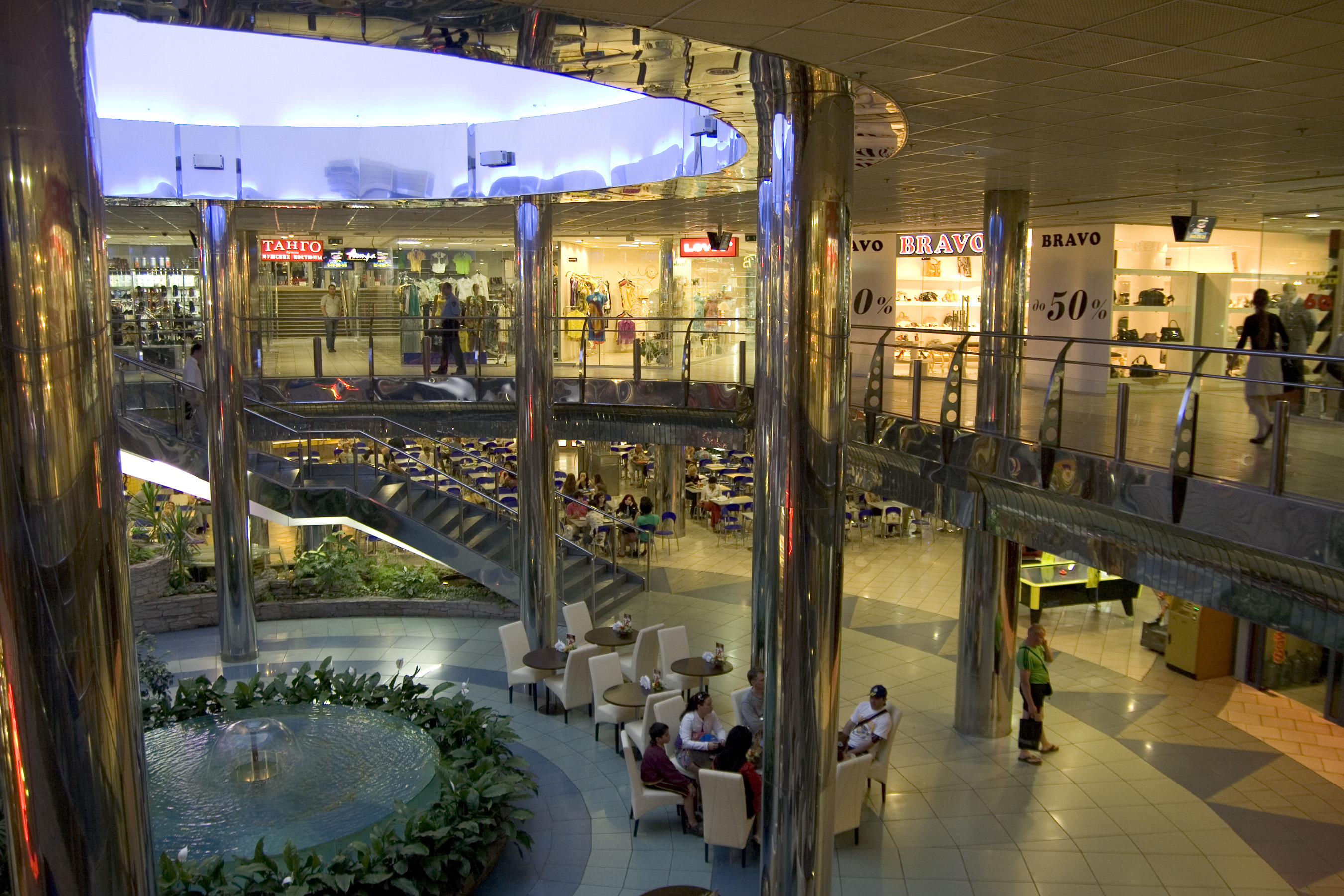
- Location: Kyiv
- Opened: 2001
- Developer: SV Development
- Owner: VS Energy; UIFK
- Architect: Oleksandr Koval
- Floors: 2
- Website: http://metrograd.kiev.ua/

The Metrohrad (Ukrainian: Метроград) is an extensive underground shopping mall at Bessarabska Square, Kyiv, Ukraine.

== Overview ==
The underground mall is located in the central part of Kyiv and stretches from the Square of Ukrainian Heroes to the Bessarabska Square along the Velyka Vasylkivska Street. It has two levels and an area of 20,000 sq meters. It is also being used as an underpass and has exits to Ploshcha Ukrainskykh Heroiv metro station, Velyka Vasylkivska Street, Tarasa Shevchenka Boulevard, Bessarabsky Market and Baseina Street The mall is divided on seven quarters by function:

- New quarter
- Children goods quarter
- Service quarter
- Home goods quarter
- Central quarter
- Restaurant and entertainment quarter
- Fountains quarter

== History ==
Metrohrad Shopping Mall was built in one year in 2001, soon after the reconstruction of Khreshchatyk. Nearby there was a construction of the similar shopping mall called Globus at Maidan Nezalezhnosti. Allegedly both of the project were approved to disrupt the anti-government protests in the center of Kyiv.

In 2017, the mall had undergone the reconstruction of several quarters, some exits were closed during the work making it harder to pass the street as there were no options other than the underpass.

During 2022 Russian invasion of Ukraine Kyiv courts began to arrest the Russian business in the city, Metrohrad had been arrested as well because one of its owners was VS Energy, the company of Russian politician Alexander Babakov who was under sanctions since 2014.
