= Ezras Torah =

Ezras Torah (Hebrew: עזרת תורה) may refer to:

- The Ezras Torah Fund, a Jewish American charitable organization
- Ezrat Torah, a neighborhood in Jerusalem
  - Ezrat Torah St., the neighborhood's main street
