= National Hotel, Kyiv =

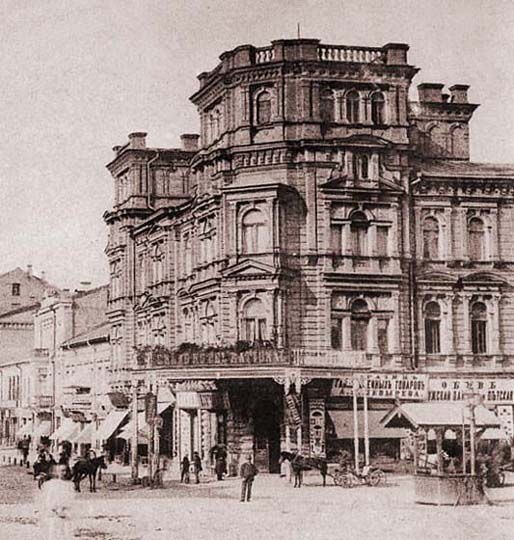
The National Hotel in Kyiv.

The National Hotel (Ukrainian: Готель "Національ") is a hotel in Kyiv built by architect Vladimir Nikolayev in 1876. It was located on the site of the current Orbita Cinema building at 29/1 Khreshchatyk Street. It was considered one of the most beautiful buildings on old Khreshchatyk Street.

== History ==
As early as the 1830s, the renowned architect Vikentiy Beretti operated a small two-story hotel on this site (Mykola Kostomarov stayed there in 1845, and Taras Shevchenko in 1846). In 1876, a three-story building designed by Vladimir Nikolayev was erected in place of the old building, commissioned by the next owner of the mansion, the merchant Marr. The building closed off Khreshchatyk Street and its second façade faced Bessarabska Square.

The hotel was distinguished by its original design. The emphasis was on the four-story corner of the building, as opposed to the three that faced Khreshchatyk and Bessarabka. In this way, the architect successfully emphasized and architecturally resolved the important intersection of the city's central streets. The ground floor of the building was rented to shops, and the upper two floors were occupied by the National Hotel, whose first owner was the entrepreneur Schultz. Since 1906, the Electrobiograph cinema operated on the hotel premises.

The National Hotel building was destroyed, along with the entirety Khreshchatyk, during the 1941 mining of Kyiv. At that time, the Red Army mined much of Khreshchatyk and other important buildings in Kyiv so they could be blown up in the event of a German advance.
