= Khreshchatyk =

Main street of Kyiv, Ukraine

Khreshchatyk Хрещатик
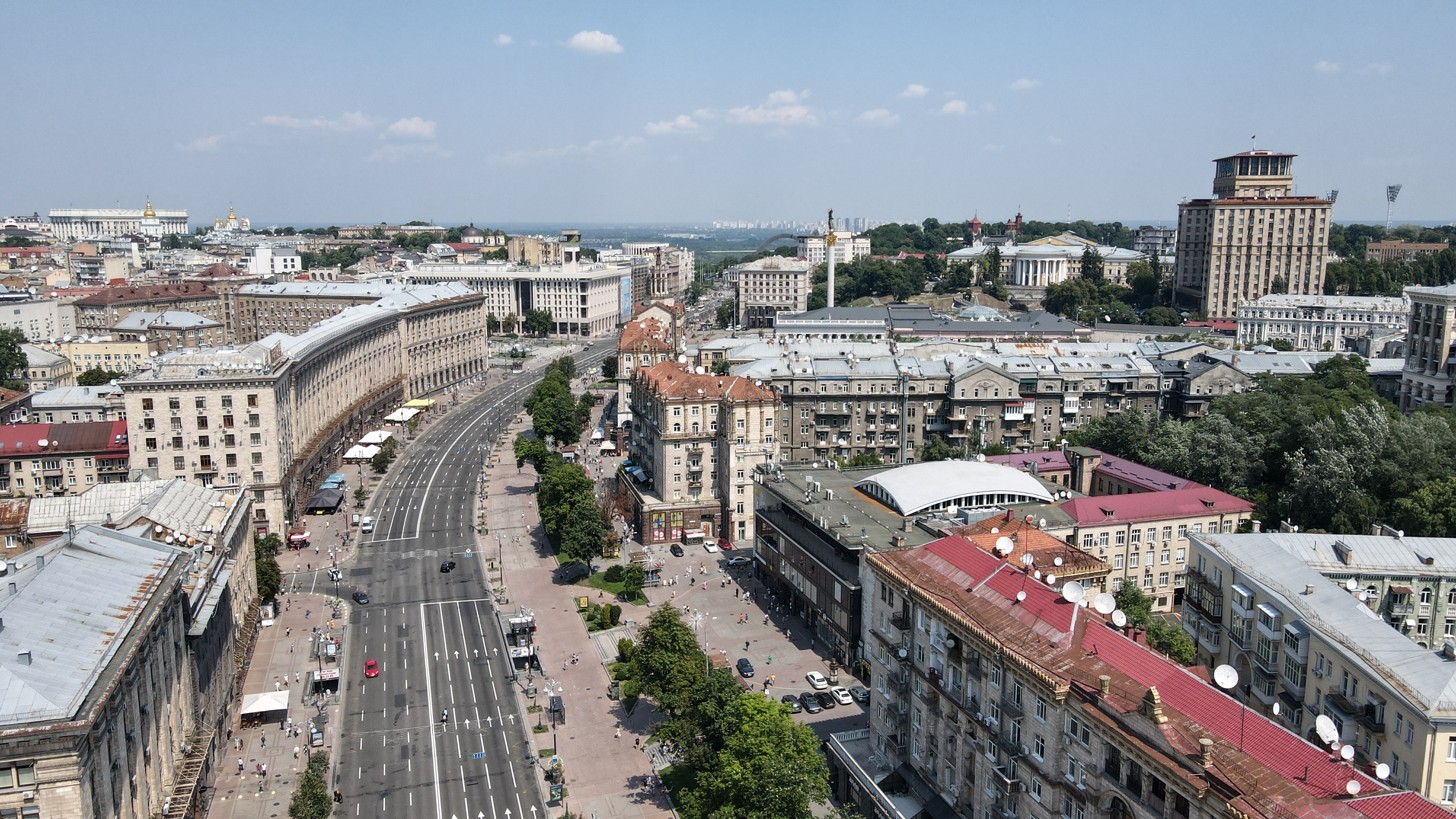
- Khreshchatyk in 2021
- Former names: Wacław Worowski Street (1923–1937), Eichhornstraße (1941–1943)
- Length: 1.2 km (0.75 mi)
- Location: Kyiv, Ukraine
- Nearest metro station: Maidan Nezalezhnosti / Khreschchatyk ( /); Teatralna / Zoloti Vorota ( /)
- Coordinates: 50°26′50″N 30°31′19″E
- From: European Square
- Major junctions: Maidan Nezalezhnosti
- To: Bessarabska Square

Other
- Status: pedestrianised during weekends and public holidays

Immovable Monument of Local Significance of Ukraine
- Official name: Вулиця Хрещатик (Khreshchatyk Street)
- Type: Urban Planning
- Reference no.: 927-Кв

Khreshchatyk (Ukrainian: Хрещатик, Ukrainian pronunciation: [xreˈʃt͡ʃɑtɪk]) is the main street of Kyiv, the capital city of Ukraine. The street is 1.2 kilometres (0.75 mi) long, and runs in a northeast-southwest direction from European Square through the Maidan to Bessarabska Square and the Besarabsky Market. The offices of the Kyiv City Council, the Post Office, the Ministry of Agrarian Policy and Food, the State Committee of Television and Radio Broadcasting, the TsUM department store, and the Ukrainian House are all located on Khreshchatyk.

Khreshchatyk was deliberately destroyed during World War II by retreating Red Army troops. Among the notable buildings that were dynamited were the Kyiv City Duma, the Kyiv Stock Exchange, the National Hotel, and the Ginsburg Skyscraper. The street was rebuilt in a Stalinist neoclassical style after the end of the war, and has been renovated since Ukraine's independence.

== History ==
=== Origins ===
The area of Kyiv now occupied by Khreshchatyk was originally a forest-covered valley with a stream flowing through it. In ancient times, it was a hunting place where Kyiv residents hung out nets to catch wild animals, which gave the ancient name of the area, Perevesishte. The name Khreshchatyk is believed to be derived from the Slavic word krest or khrest (cross), as it lies in a valley that is crossed by several ravines. A small river, the Khreshchatyk River, a tributary of the Lybid River, ran along much of the valley. A road ran beside the stream.

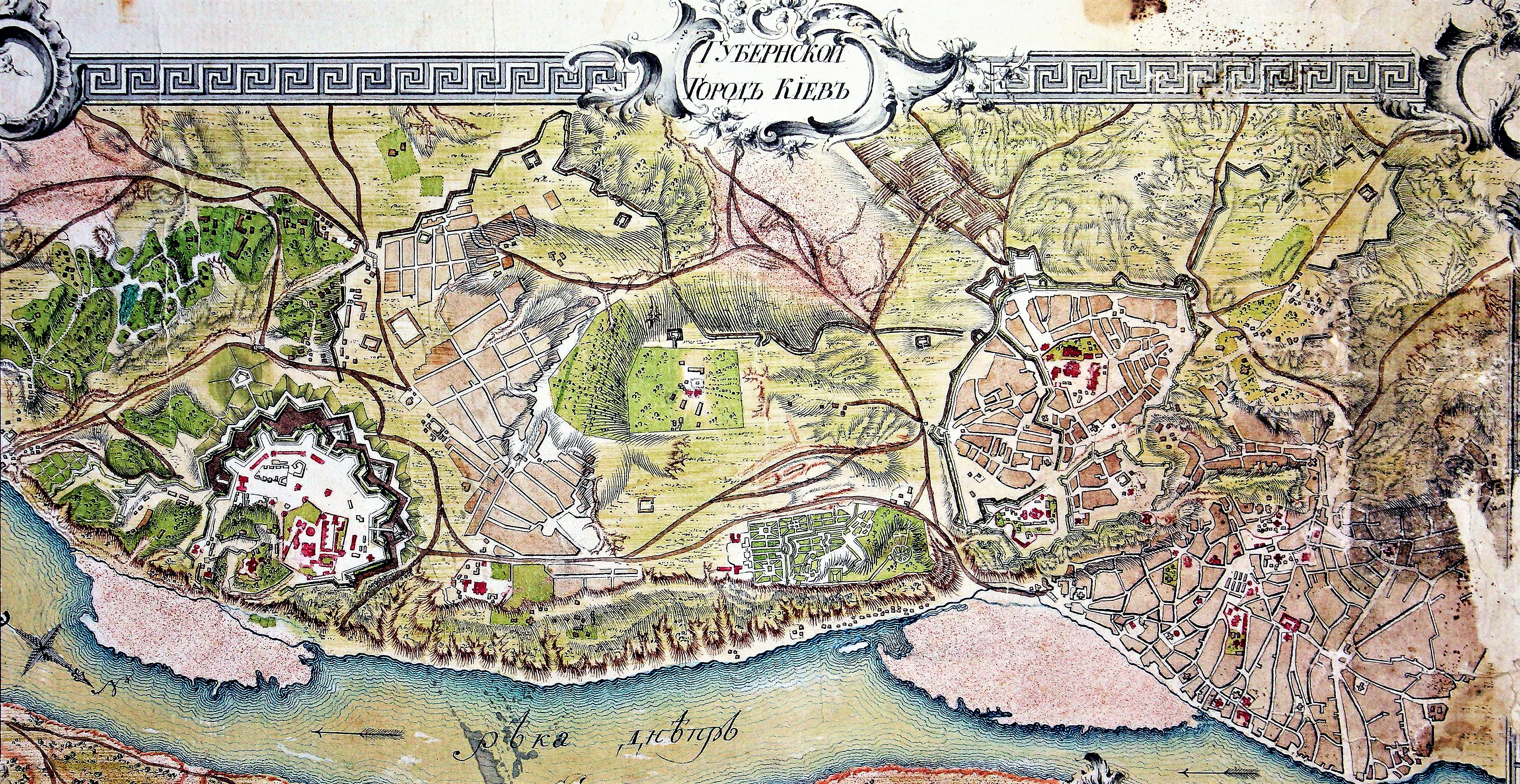
A 1780s map of Kyiv

In 1770, the doctor and diarist John Lerche described the landscape: "At the end of the Pechersk suburb, there is a narrow road (Khreshchatytskaya) due to a deep gulley or valley; but it cannot be avoided, because it connects all three cities."

In Kievan Rus' times, the fortifications of the Upper Town existed across Old Kyiv Hill above the ravine. These had been reduced to ruins by the early 19th century, when they were removed, leaving a square at the foot the hill at the modern Maidan Nezalezhnosti. Construction of the street started at the end of the 18th century, when the ravine began to be filled in. The first houses, built in 1797, were wooden, with the earliest recorded building being the late 18th-century mansion of a landowner called Golovinsky.

=== 19th century - World War I ===
In 1804–1806, the first theatre in Kyiv was built at one end of the street. It was a wooden structure that was later demolished and replaced by the three-storey European Hotel.

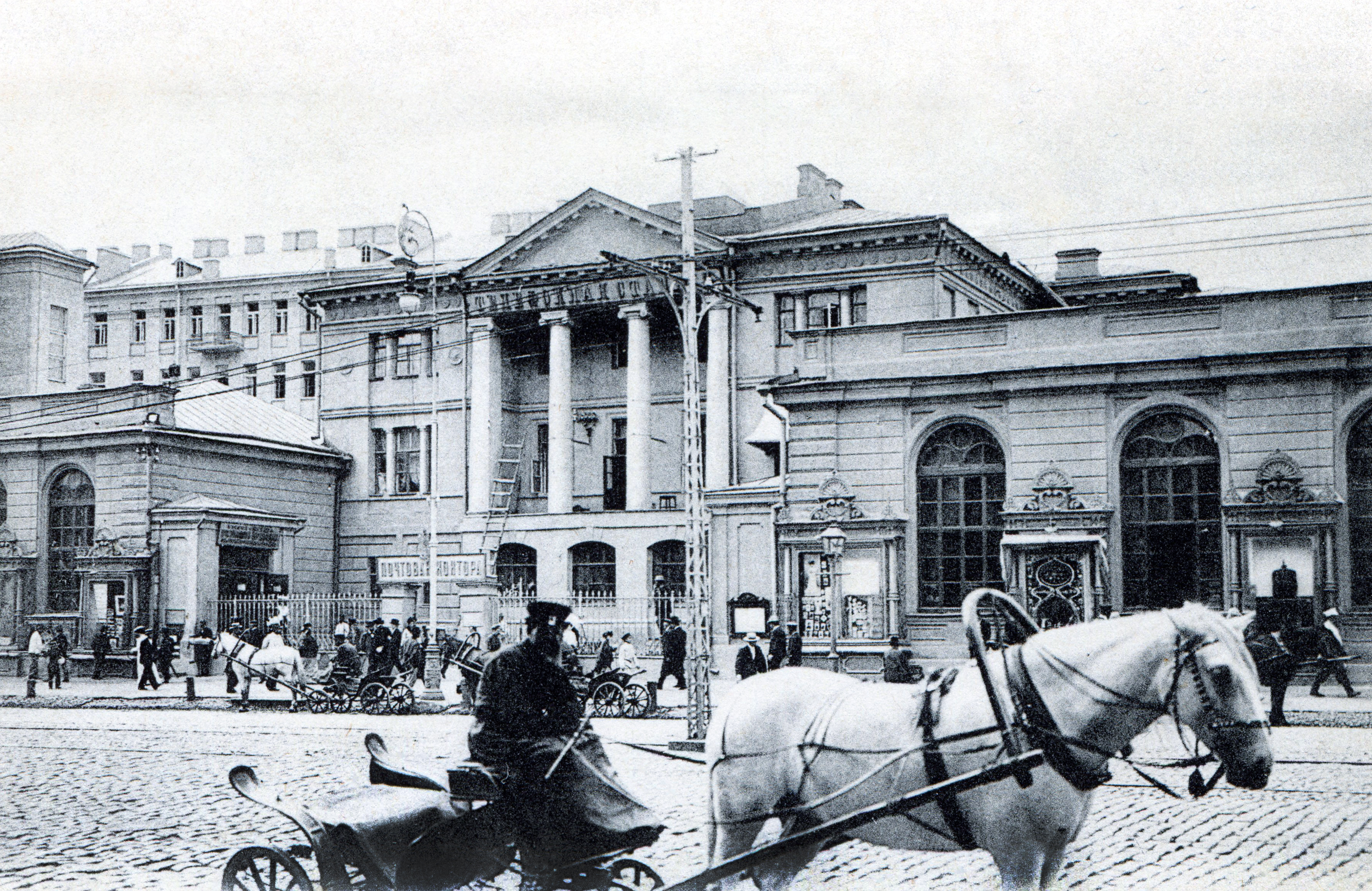
Kyiv Central Post Office in the 1900s

Khreshchatyk began to be developed in the 1830s and 1840s, beginning from the European Square end. Its current design emerged in 1837 when it was planned as Kyiv's principal street by architects that included the city architect, Ludvik Stanzani. From 1868 banks started to be located on Khreshchatyk. The Kyiv Stock Exchange was built in 1869. The thoroughfare became one of the most famous in the Russian Empire. The new City Hall was built on the street in 1874–1876. Other notable buildings constructed during this period were the Merchants' Hall, the concert hall, the Central Post Office, and the Club for Polish Noblemen. During the 1880s, its wooden-built restaurants and taverns were being replaced by stone-built multi-storey houses and shops. The street, with its departmental stores and hotels, was called "the only real street in Kiev," and, along with the city’s larger churches, became its central modern attraction for visitors.

The Brotherhood of Saints Cyril and Methodius met at the apartment of 19th-century Ukrainian historian Mykola Kostomarov on Khreshchatyk.

The street was lit by gas in 1872, and by electricity in the 1890s. In 1897 it was still the only street in the city with electric lights. Horse-drawn trams had first appeared in the city in 1869, and steam-powered trams a few years later; but the terrain was too hilly for them, and they sometimes ran out of control downhill. In 1892, the first electric tram line in the empire ran in Kyiv, and the Russian Empire's first electric tram was extended from Khreshchatyk to Podol. In 1904, the pavement was laid with granite cobbles, having been first provided with a hard surface in 1888,

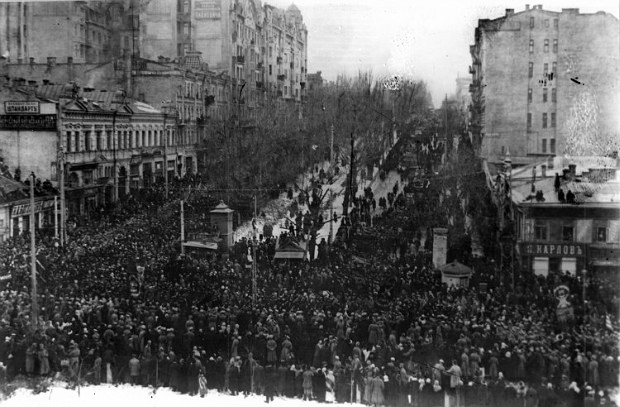
The demonstration on Khreshchatyk, March 1917

Revolutionary rallies and demonstrations took place on the street in 1901, 1902, 1905, and in June 1917.

=== Pre-World War II Soviet Ukraine ===
During the period of chaos after the Russian Revolution of 1917, the Ukrainian, German, Polish, and Russian Bolshevik forces all controlled Kyiv at various times. On 9 May 1920, the Polish army under General Rydz-Smigly celebrated their capture of Kyiv by a victory parade on Khreshchatyk. They were driven out by the Russian Bolshevik counter-offensive within weeks.

After the establishment of the Soviet authorities, Khreshchatyk became a place where celebrations, labour demonstrations, and military parades took place.

Between the wars, Khreshchatyk underwent major development and reconstruction. Between 1923 and 1937, it was renamed Vorovsky Street, after Vatslav Vorovsky, an early Bolshevik diplomat who had been assassinated in Switzerland. In 1934–1935 the street was re-paved, the tram line was removed and a trolleybus service began.

=== World War II ===
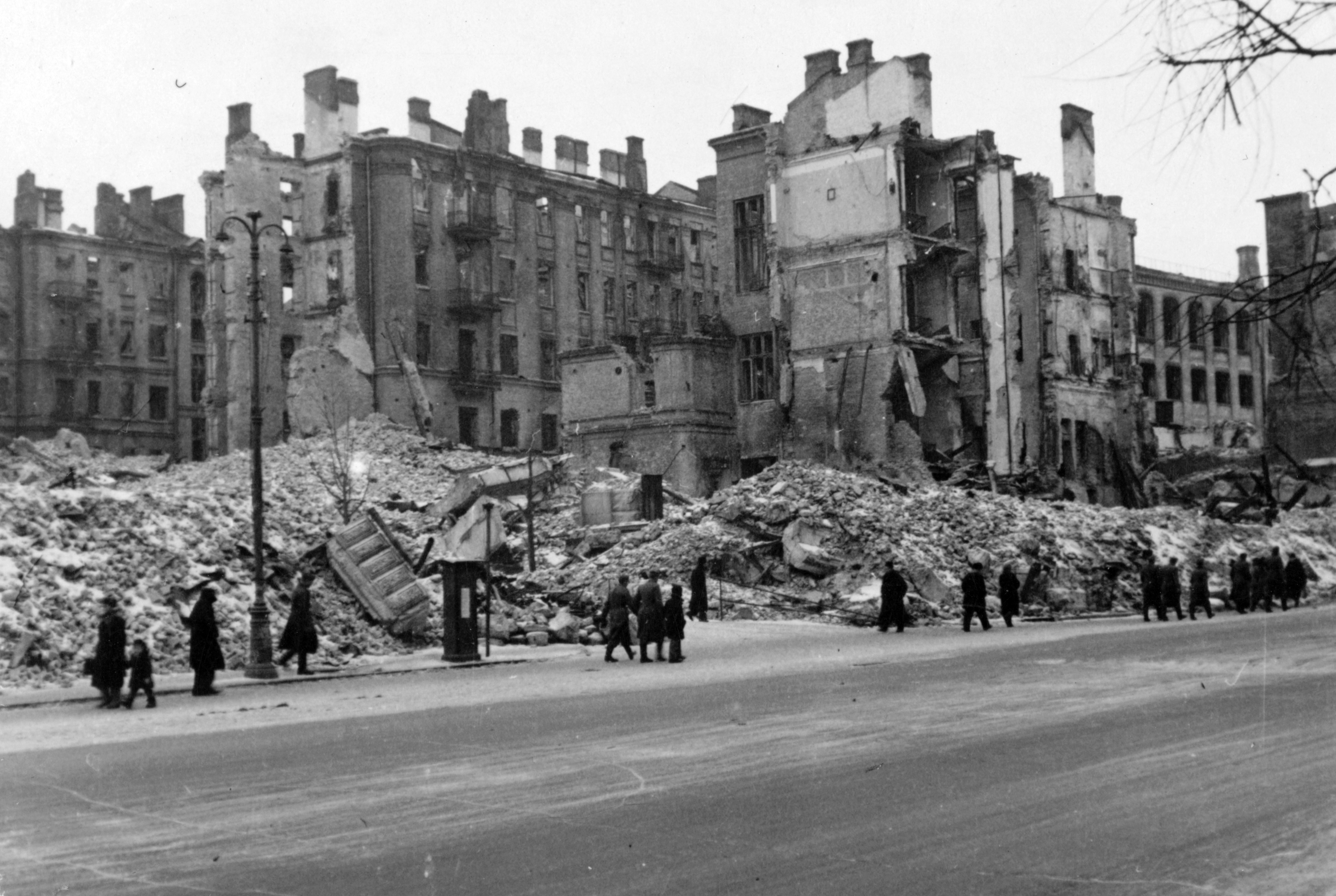
The remains of part of the street following its destruction in September 1941

During World War II, almost every building on Khreshchatyk was laid with explosives by the retreating Red Army troops. On 24 September 1941, five days after German troops had occupied the city, radio-controlled explosions were set off from over 400 kilometres (250 mi) away. The demolition of Khreshchatyk became the first operation in history where the long-distance radio-controlled explosions were used for military purposes. This unprecedented method of warfare caused panic and brought heavy casualties among both the occupiers and city's remaining civilian population.

Under German occupation, the street was renamed Eichhornstrasse, after Hermann von Eichhorn, a field marshal and the supreme commander of Army Group Kyiv and simultaneously military governor of Ukraine during the previous German occupation, who in 1918 had been assassinated on Khreshchatyk by the social revolutionary Boris Donskoy.

=== Post-war Soviet Ukraine ===
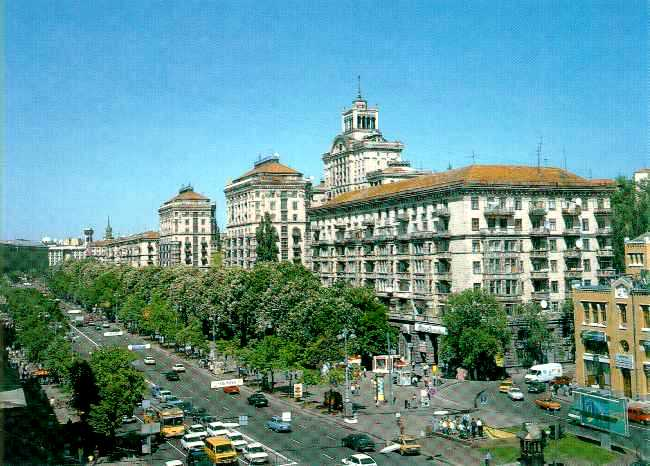
Khreshchatyk during the 1980s

In 1944, the Soviet authorities planned to enlarge Khreschatyk when it was rebuilt. After the end of the war, 30 damaged buildings that could have been restored were demolished. The thoroughfare was rebuilt in the 1950s and 1960s. It was widened to become 75–100 metres (246–328 ft) wide, and new buildings were erected in the Neoclassical Stalinist architectural style. Important buildings of the new ensemble include the headquarters of Kyiv City Council (Kyivrada), the Central Post Office (Poshtamt) and Trade Unions Building (Budynok Profspilok). The picturesque quality of Khreshchatyk was enhanced by the street being replanted with horse chestnut trees.

The street was used for demonstrations and parades in honour of 1 May (until 1969), Victory Day (9 May) and the October Revolution.

The street was one of the first parts of the city to be serviced by the Kyiv Metro, when the Khreshchatyk station was opened in 1960, and became the system's first transfer station upon the opening of a second line in 1976.

A few days after the Chernobyl nuclear accident, the Soviet authorities held the 1986 May Day parade on Khreshchatyk, to "calm people" and "prevent panic" caused by the disaster. Thousands of Kyivans, including many children, were exposed to dangerous doses of radiation as a result.

In 1989, part of the Kyiv Central Post Office building collapsed during heavy rain, killing a dozen people and injuring others.

=== Post-independence ===
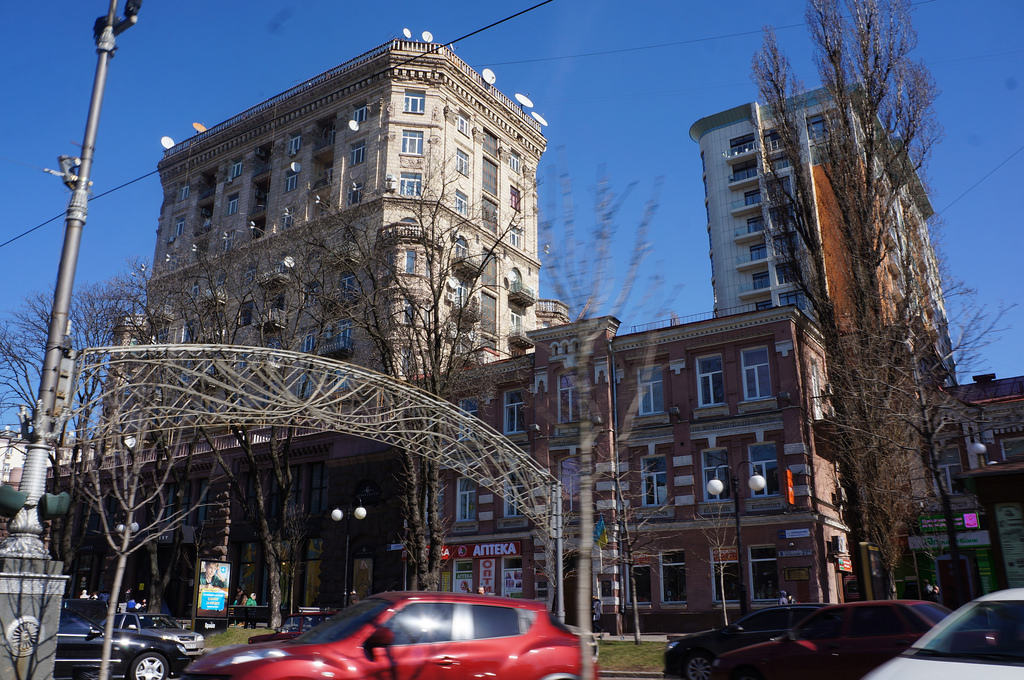
Imperial, Stalinist and modern buildings on Khreshchatyk

On 24 July 1990, the first ceremonial raising of the Ukrainian national flag took place on Khreshchatyk, at the Kyiv City Council building. In 2010, Khreshchatyk was listed as one of Europe's most expensive streets for renting commercial space. The Kyiv Independence Day Parades, passing through Khreshchatyk, have been held since 1994.

In 2000/2001, Khreshchatyk and Maidan Nezalezhnosti became the centre of the mass protest campaign Ukraine without Kuchma. To keep the protesters out, the city mayor Oleksandr Omelchenko ordered the area to be fenced off as a construction site. In the winter of 2004, Khreshchatyk and Maidan Nezalezhnosti became the centre of the main public protests of the Orange Revolution. The protesters' main tent encampment was situated in the street. At its peak, over a million people from all around Ukraine attended the rally. In late 2013, Khreshchatyk became one of the centres of the Revolution of Dignity.

Following the 2022 Russian invasion of Ukraine, the annual Kyiv parade was cancelled, and in its place there was a display of the burnt remains of Russian military vehicles. It was reported that Russian forces were expecting to parade down Khreshchatyk within three days of the start of the invasion, and that some soldiers had been issued ceremonial uniforms for that purpose.

Kyiv City Council, Kyiv City State Administration, the Ministry of Agrarian Policy and Food, the State Committee for Television and Radio-broadcasting, and a number of cinemas and hotels, are all located on the street.

== Attractions ==
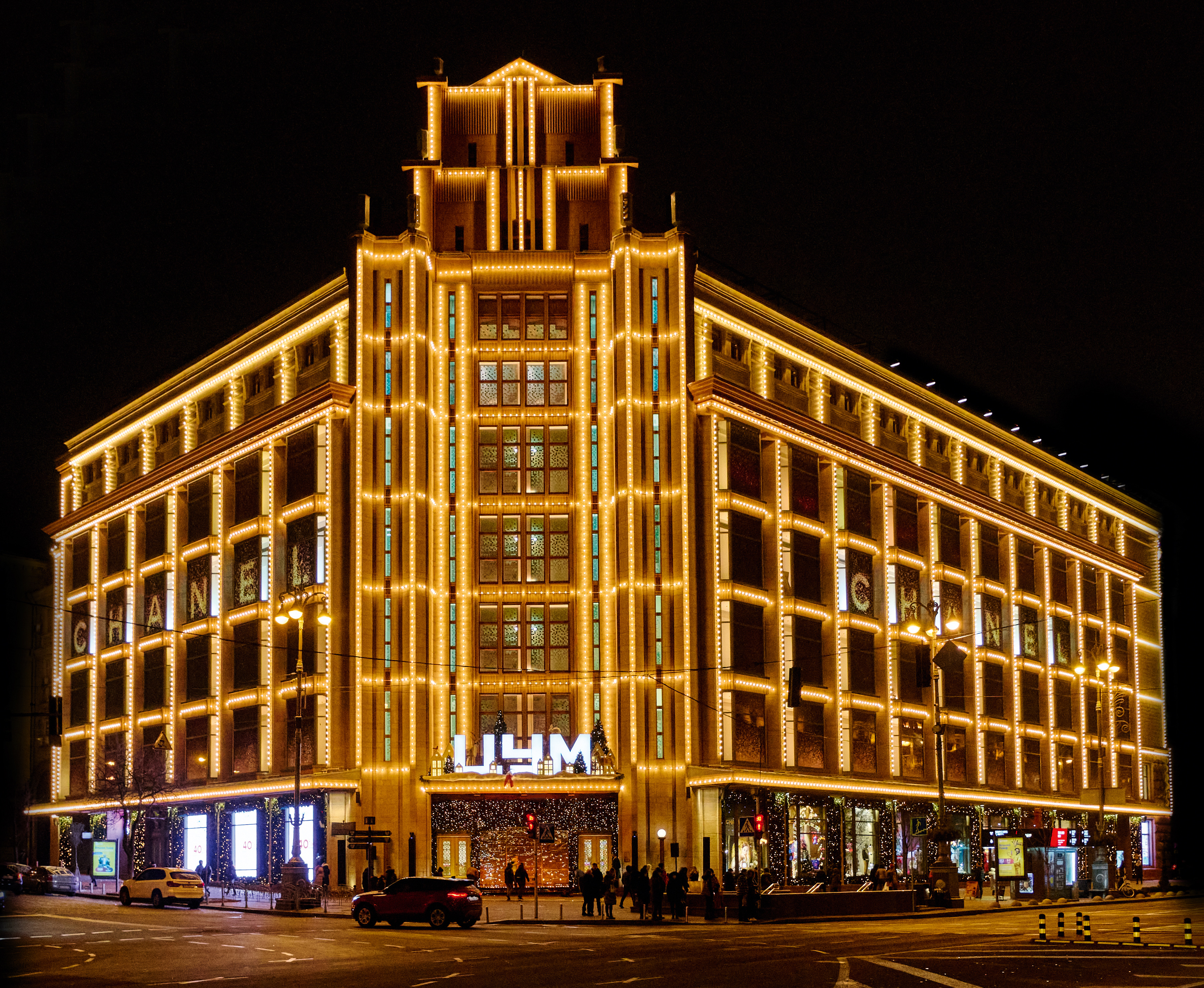
TSUM Kyiv

Khreshchatyk is a popular attraction for visitors to the city and residents. During weekends, the street is closed to road traffic. It is a traditional setting for outdoor concerts and festivals, and is frequented by street musicians.

Points of interest include the 19th-century Besarabsky indoor Market, the shops, offices and PinchukArtCentre in the Besarabsky Quarter, the Metrohrad underground shopping centre, TSUM Kyiv, Kyiv Passage (a small narrow commercial and residential street), and the City Council building.

Major parades and celebrations are held on Kyiv Day (the last Sunday of May), Victory Day (9 May), and Independence Day (24 August).

During the Revolution of Dignity in February 2014, much of the lethal clashes took place at the intersection of Khreshchatyk and especially Instytutska Street; as a tribute to the fallen, part of the latter street was renamed in January 2015 to Alley of Heroes of the Heavenly Hundred.

== Transportation ==
Four of the stations of the Kyiv Metro, the city's rapid transit system, serve the street. Passengers are able to transfer by foot from Maidan Nezalezhnosti to Khreshchatyk, as well as from Teatralna to Zoloti Vorota.

== In culture ==
Khreshchatyk is the subject of an eponymous Ukrainian pop song written and performed by Pavlo Zibrov to the words of Yuriy Rybchynskyi.

== Sources ==
- Demes, Pavol; Forbrig, Joerg (2006). "Pora - 'It's Time' for Democracy in Ukraine". In Åslund, Anders; McFaul, Michael (eds.). Revolution in Orange: The Origins of Ukraine's Democratic Breakthrough. Washington, DC: Carnegie Endowment for International Peace. ISBN 978-08700-3-221-9.
- Dobrovolsky, Anatoliy, ed. (1981). Київ. Енциклопедичний довідник [Kyiv: An Encyclopedic Guide] (in Ukrainian).
- Hamm, Michael F. (1993). Kiev: A Portrait, 1800–1917. Princeton, New Jersey: Princeton University Press. ISBN 978-14008-5-151-5.
- Hansen, Arve (2021). Urban Protest: A Spatial Perspective on Kyiv, Minsk, and Moscow. Columbia University Press. ISBN 978-38382-1-495-5.
- Krutikov, Mikhail (2019). Der Nister's Soviet Years: Yiddish Writer as Witness to the People. Indiana University Press. ISBN 978-02530-4-188-3.
- Oliynyk, Olena (2018). "National originality of the architecture of Khreshchatyk as a unique ensemble of the period of totalitarianism" (PDF). E3S Web of Conferences (33).
- Semenova, P. P., ed. (1897) [1752]. Живописная Россия: Отечество наше в его земельном, историческом, племенном, экономическом и бытовом значении [Picturesque Russia: Our Fatherland in its land, historical, tribal, economic and everyday meaning] (in Russian). Vol. 5. St. Petersburg. Archived from the original on 9 September 2018.
