= Destroyed Russian military equipment exhibition =

Ukrainian public exhibition of captured Russian military equipment

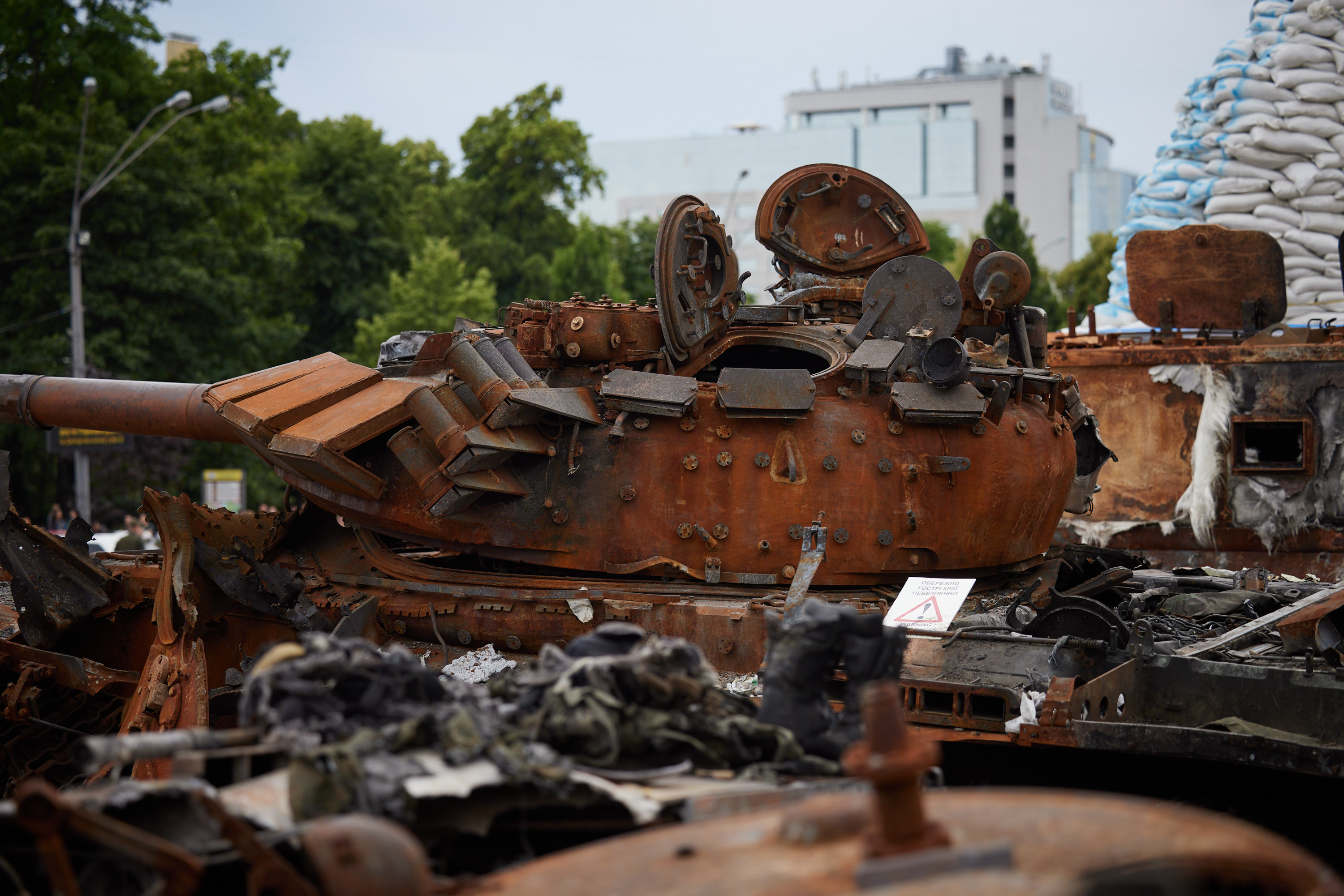
Destroyed Russian tanks in Mykhailivs'ka Square.

The destroyed Russian military equipment exhibition is an open-air exhibition on Mykhailivska Square in Kyiv. It was opened on 21 May 2022, and features Russian military equipment that was captured and destroyed during the 2022 Russian invasion of Ukraine.

== Exhibition on Mykhailivska Square ==
According to the official website of the president of Ukraine, exhibits include a Pantsir-S1 self-propelled anti-aircraft artillery system, a T-72B3 tank, a BMD-2 infantry fighting vehicle, a BMD-4 turret, an electronic warfare vehicle and the remains of a Tigr infantry mobility vehicle. Most of this equipment was used during the Kyiv offensive.

The Ukrainian president Volodymyr Zelenskyy showed the exhibition to the prime minister of the United Kingdom Boris Johnson during the latter's visit to Ukraine on 17 June 2022.

It was reported that the exhibition on Mykhailivska Square would become part of the exposition of the National Military Historical Museum of Ukraine.

== Exhibition on Khreshchatyk street ==
On 20 August 2022, a similar, but larger exhibition opened on Kyiv's central Khreshchatyk street. According to Ukraine's minister of defense Oleksii Reznikov, the exhibition on Khreshchatyk consisted of about 80 Russian military equipment units, destroyed and captured in various regions of Ukraine, including T-90, T-80 and T-72 tanks, self-propelled artillery systems, rocket artillery, armored vehicles, Pantsir-S1 missile system, TOS-1A Solntsepyok, Hosta self-propelled howitzer, etc.
