= Kyiv City Duma building =

Destroyed building in Kyiv, Ukraine

Coordinates: 50°27′0″N 30°31′27″E

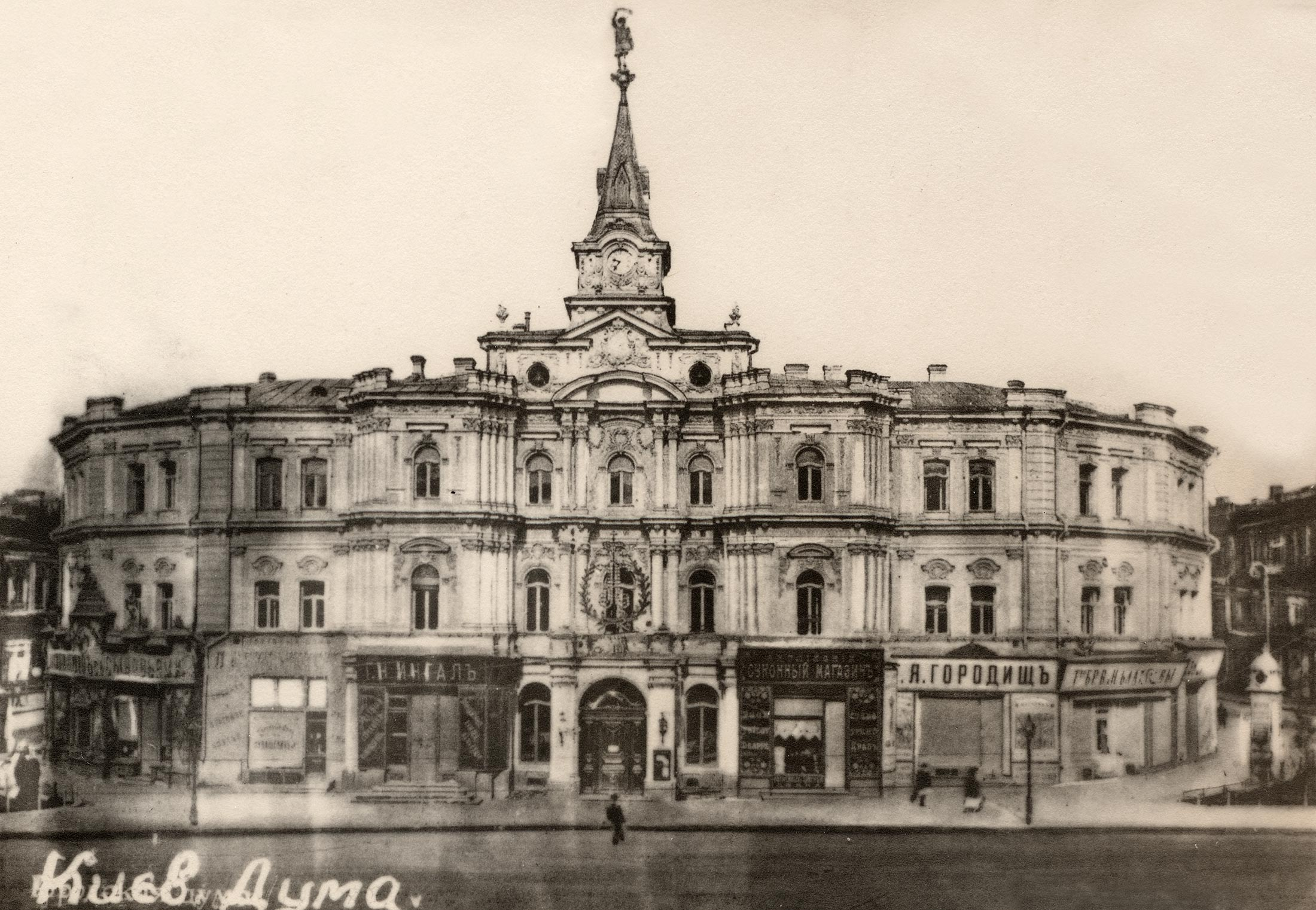
The Kyiv City Duma building

The Kyiv City Duma building (Ukrainian: Будинок Київської думи, romanized: Budynok Kyivskoi dumy) housed the Kyiv City Duma before World War II. The building was located on the then Dumskaya Ploschad (now Maidan Nezalezhnosti) on Khreschatyk street in Kyiv and stood in the centre of it.

== History ==
On 22 July 1874 the Kyiv mayor (and titular Prince of San-Donato) Pavel Demidov organized festivities to commemorate installation of the new Kyiv City Duma building on project of the Russian architect Aleksandr Shile that since 1834 was located in the former building of the liquidated Kyiv Magistrate (Nazar Sukhota Building, today the Podilskyi District Building of Children Artistry). For the project were allocated 180,000 rubles. The building was finished in 1878 and on 22 January 1878 the building housed its first session of the city duma. In this manner the city administrative center was moved out of the Kyiv Podil for the first time since 1490s closer to Pechersk. The house was built with brick and originally had only two floor levels. A statue of archangel Michael, the patron of Kyiv, stood on the spire atop the building created by the Kyivan sculptor Yeva Kulikovska (a wife of Kyivan architect Valerian Kulykovskyi). After the building was built the city square at its location was named after it. In 1900 another Russian architect Aleksandr Krivosheyev added another floor level and it became a three-story building.

After the Russian Revolution when the Soviets took power, the archangel was replaced with a five pointed star. Also in 1919, instead of the city Duma, the building was occupied by the regional executive committee and the regional committee of the Communist Party of Ukraine.

During World War II, the building caught fire and was partially damaged by the 1941 Khreschatyk explosions that was staged by the withdrawing Soviet NKVD troops. The withdrawing Soviet troops also destroyed the city infrastructure and the building was completely burnt down along with many other buildings of Khreschatyk. It was never rebuilt after the war and its remnants were removed.

== Gallery ==
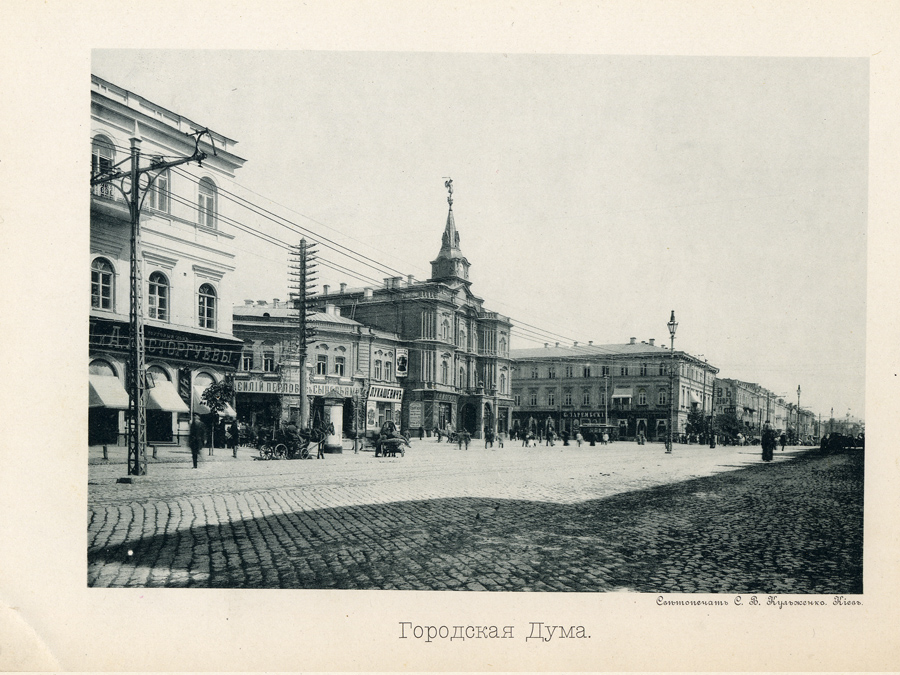
An early 20th century postcard with a picture of the Duma building and surroundings.

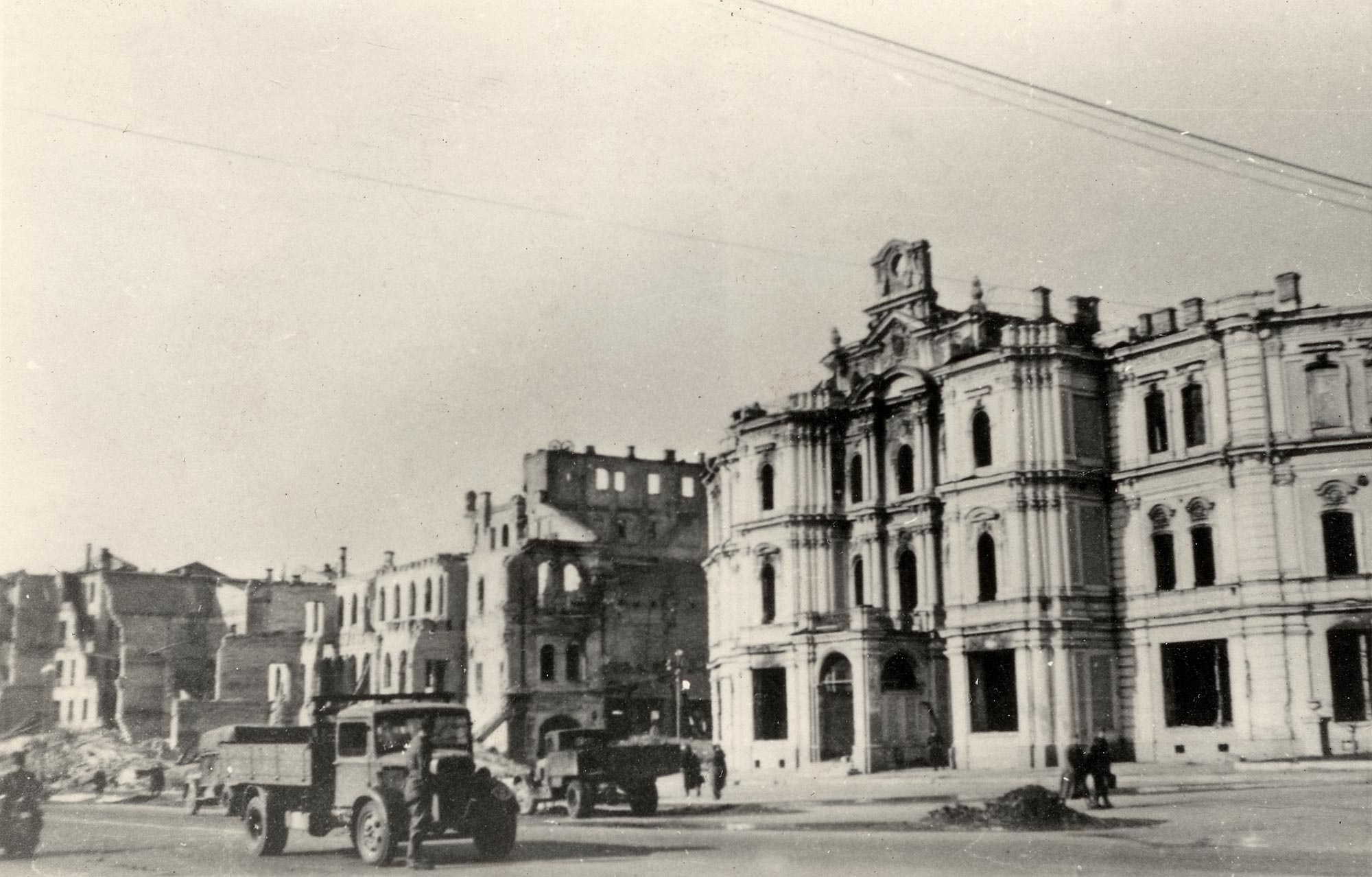
The blown up City Duma building and others after the explosions in 1941.

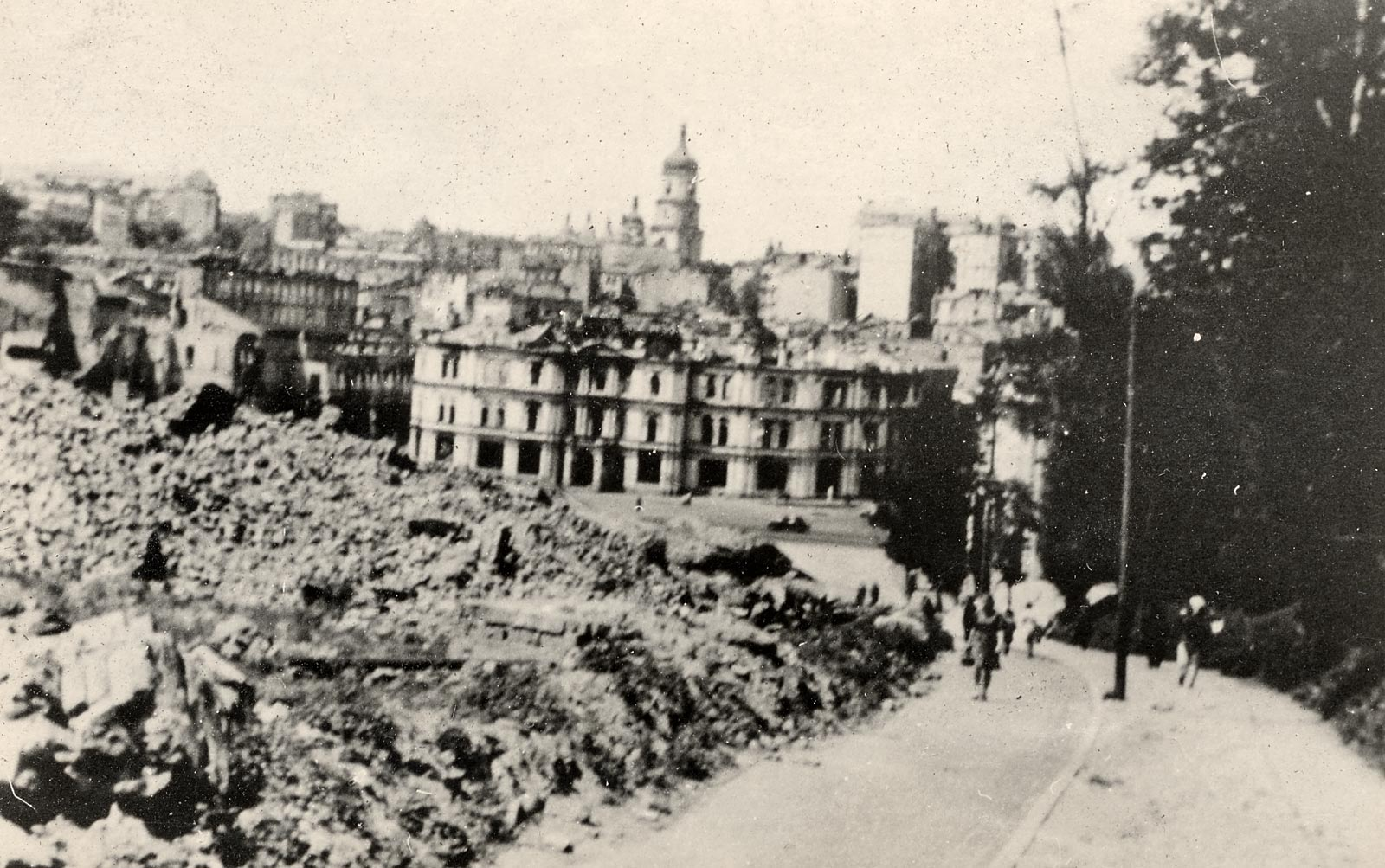
The blown up City Duma building and surroundings after the explosions in 1941.

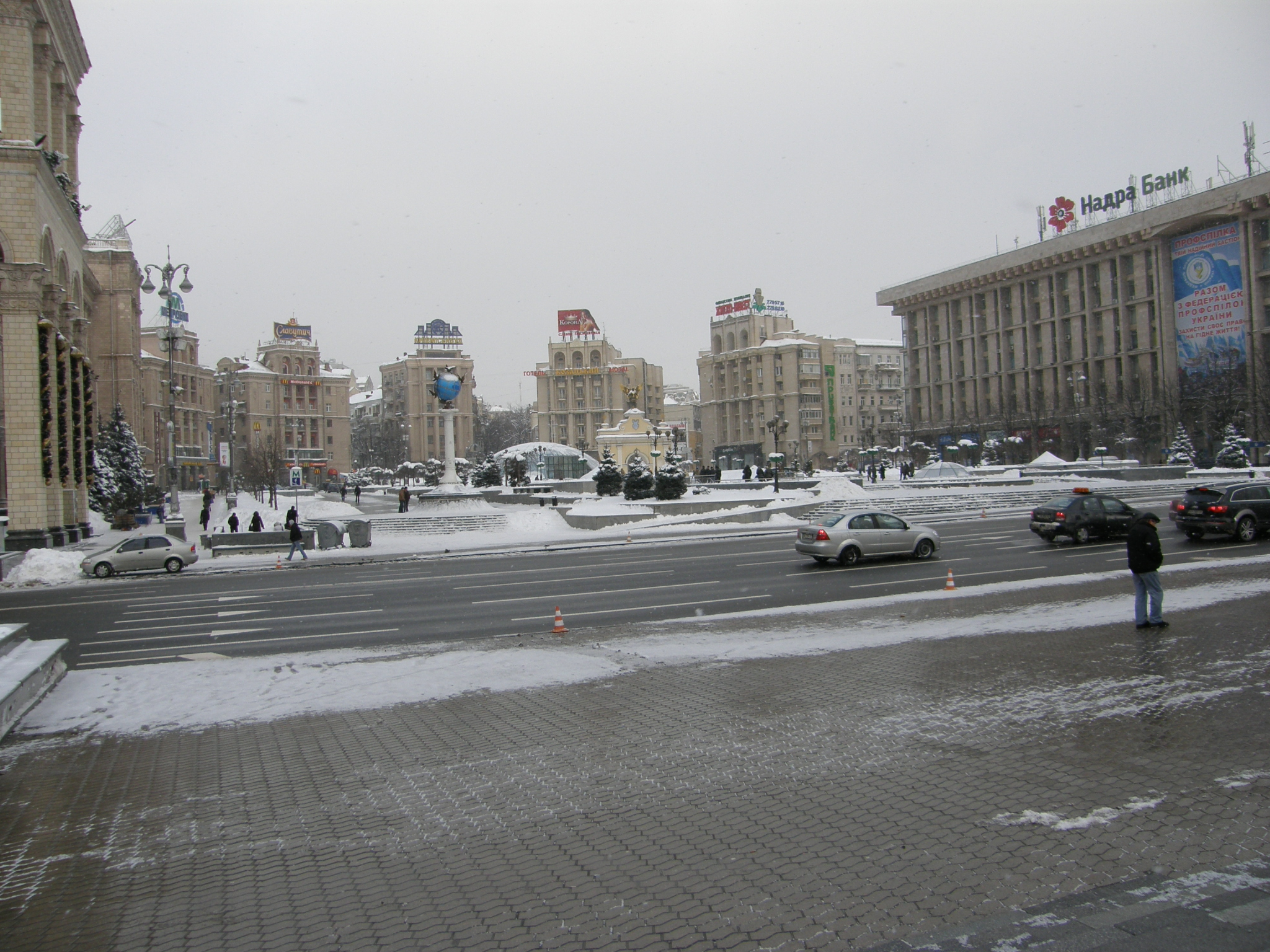
Empty lot in the same location
