= When That Day Comes =

Chinese patriotic song

When That Day Comes (simplified Chinese: 当那一天来临; traditional Chinese: 當那一天來臨; pinyin: Dāng nà yītiān láilín), also translated as As the War Approaches, is a Chinese patriotic song written by the People's Liberation Army General Political Department in 2005, with lyrics written by Wang Xiaoling. The song was created in response to a 2004 order by the Propaganda Department of the General Political Department to bolster the morale of military personnel and is about the People's Volunteer Army during the Korean War. The song was inaugurated by the People's Liberation Army on 29 July 2005, in time for the celebrations of the 78th anniversary of the founding of the PLA, at the Olympic Sports Centre in Beijing.

== Lyrics ==
The lyrics of 'When That Day Comes' represents the preparedness of the People's Liberation Army in the case of a potential war and the willingness of soldiers to serve in the defense of China.

中文原文

这是一个晴朗的早晨
鸽哨声伴着起床号音
但是这世界并不安宁
和平年代也有激荡的风云

看那军旗飞舞的方向
前进着战车、舰队和机群
上面也飘扬着我们的名字
年轻士兵渴望建立功勋

准备好了吗，士兵兄弟们
当那一天真的来临
也许来不及告别那亲人 (Note: In the complete version sung by Chen Xiaotao, there is this more tragic verse, and only after the last repetition does the following section come in.)
为了祖国我要勇敢前进

准备好了吗，士兵兄弟们
当那一天真的来临
放心吧祖国，放心吧亲人
为了胜利我要勇敢前进

English Translation

This is a morning so bright and clear
Pigeon whistles blend with bugle's call
But the world is not tranquil
Even in peacetime, storm clouds fall

See where our battle flags are streaming
Leading the tanks, fleets, squadrons on
There fly our names upon, gleaming
Young soldiers marching toward glory's dawn

Are you ready, brother soldiers
When that day finally comes?
Perhaps no time for farewell to loved ones—
For the motherland, I will bravely march on!

Are you ready, brother soldiers
When that day finally comes?
Fear not, my motherland, fear not, loved ones
For victory, I will bravely march on!

== See also ==
- Dong Fang Hong I
- The East Is Red (1965 film)
- Honglaowai
- Maoism
- "Ode to the Motherland"
- "Sailing the Seas Depends on the Helmsman"
- "Without the Communist Party, There Would Be No New China"
