= Ezras Torah Fund =

Jewish Charity

- Formation: August 25, 1915; 111 years ago
- Location: 11 North Airmont Road, Suite 4, Suffern, NY 10901
- Coordinates: 41°06′49.7″N 74°06′46.7″W
- President: Rabbi Yisrael Gettinger
- Website: www.ezrastorah.org

The Ezras Torah Fund was founded on August 25, 1915 (15 Elul, 5675) at a meeting in Congregation Mishkan Israel on the Lower East Side of Manhattan. The meeting was conducted by members of the Agudas HaRabbanim and the Vaad HaRabbanim of New York. It was an outgrowth of the Central Relief Committee (CRC) that was created to assist Orthodox Jews in Europe during World War I. The CRC had been founded in late 1914 by the Union of Orthodox Jewish Congregations of America with much help from the aforementioned rabbinical organizations. Ezras Torah's role was to specifically assist town rabbis, roshei yeshiva, and yeshivas during the upheaval years of World War I. They eventually broadened their scope to a worldwide level after the war.

The founding leadership of Ezras Torah was composed of the rabbis Israel Rosenberg, Philip Klein (aka Hillel HaKohen) and Yaakov Eskolsky. Rabbi Rosenberg was president until his death in 1956. Rabbi Klein was treasurer until his death in 1926. Rabbi Eskolsky was secretary until 1928.

The personality most prominently associated with Ezras Torah was rabbi Yosef Eliyahu Henkin, who served as the director of Ezras Torah from the summer of 1925 until his death in 1973.

== Leadership (1915–present) ==

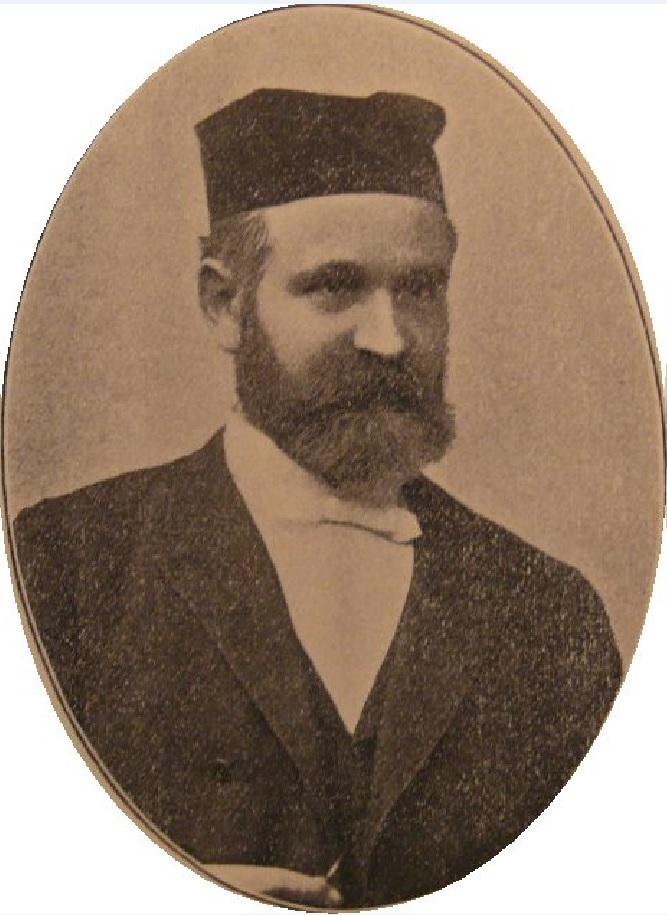

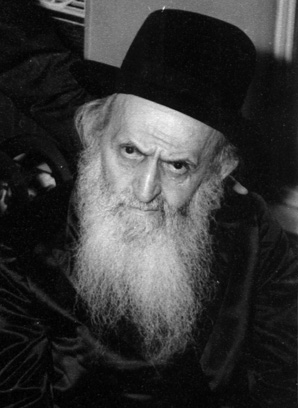

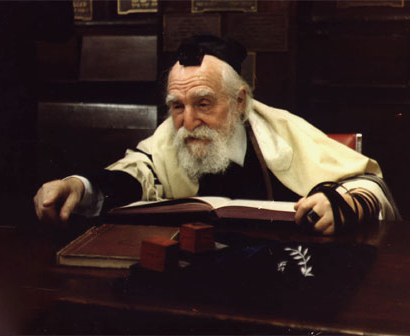

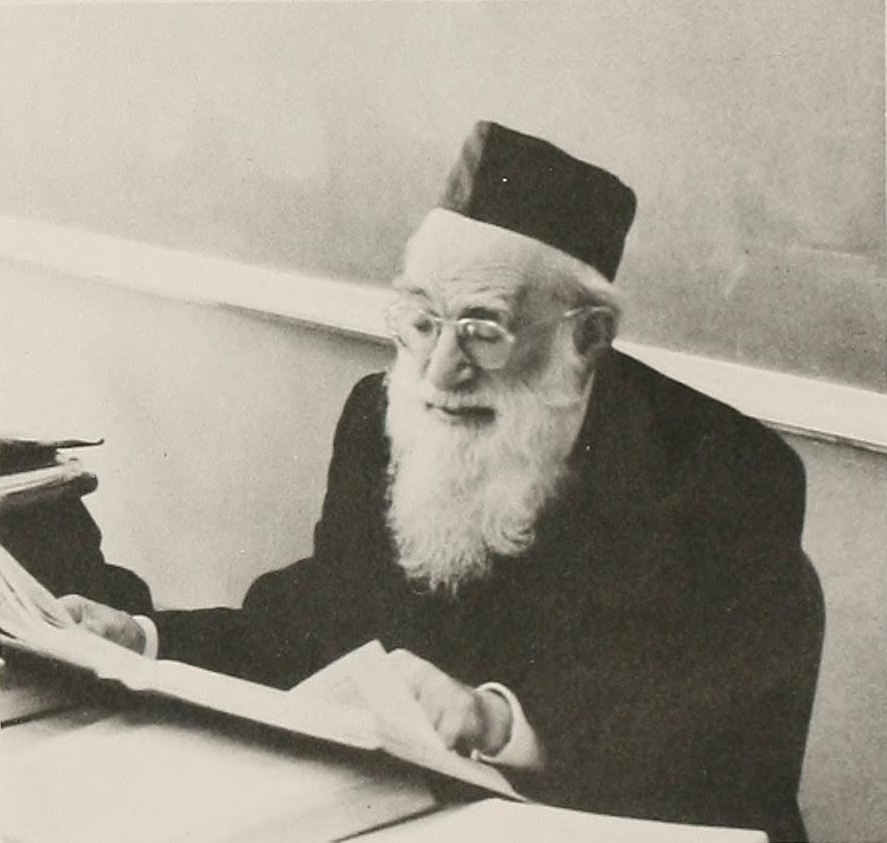

== Publications ==
- Sefer HaZikaron, c. 1919
- Zichron B'Sefer, 1922
- Luach HaYovel Shel Ezras Torah, c. 1936
- Eidus L'Yisroel, c. 1946
- She'eris Yisroel, 1956
- Luach Minhagei Beis HaKnesses, annually from 1969–present
