= Bessarabskyi Market =

Building in Ukraine

- Бессарабський ринок
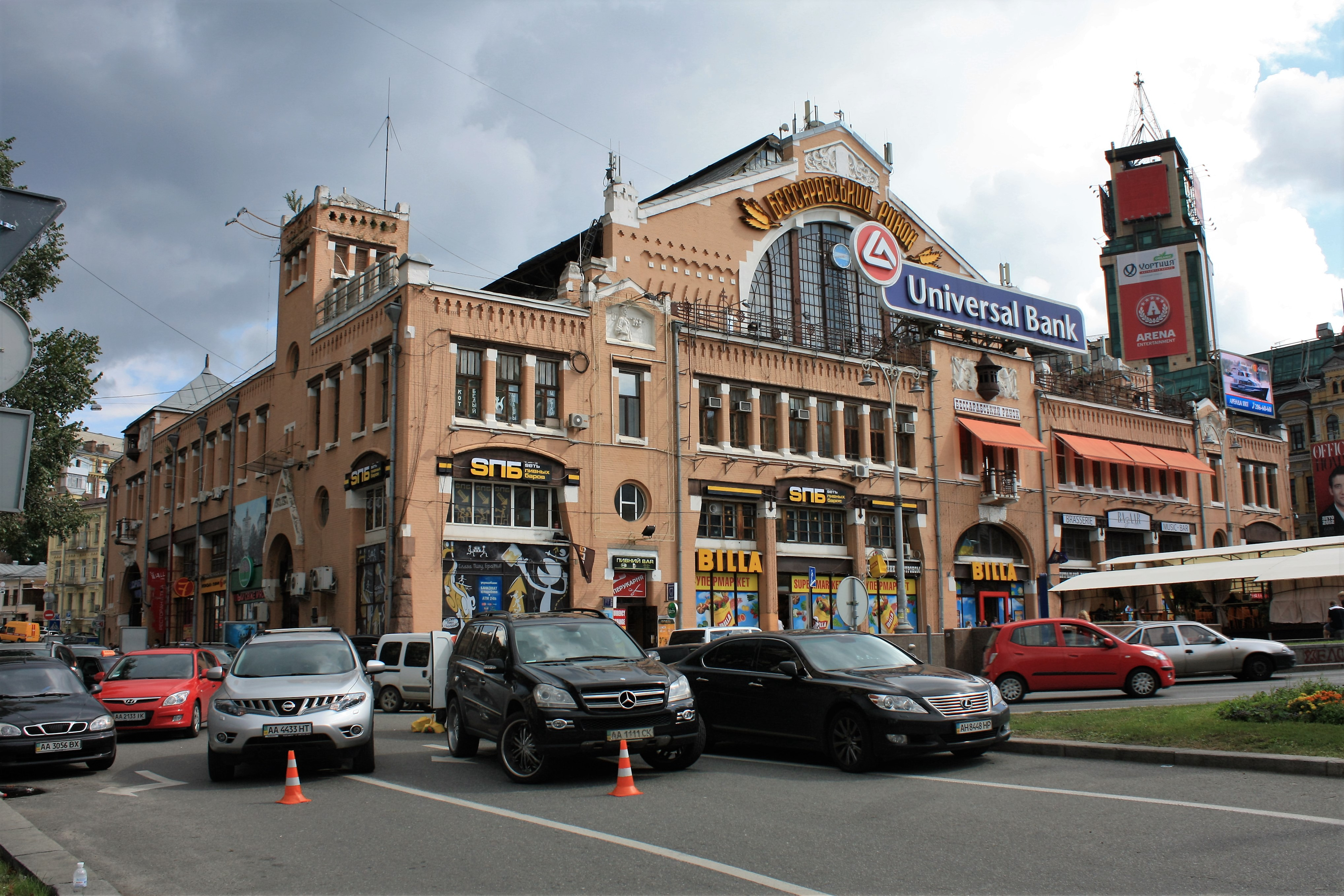
- Interactive map of the Bessarabskyi Market area

General information
- Architectural style: Art Nouveau
- Location: Kyiv, Ukraine
- Coordinates: 50°26′33″N 30°31′18″E
- Construction started: 1910
- Completed: 1912

Design and construction
- Architect: Henryk Julian Gay

Immovable Monument of National Significance of Ukraine
- Official name: Критий ринок (Indoor market)
- Type: Architecture
- Reference no.: 260106

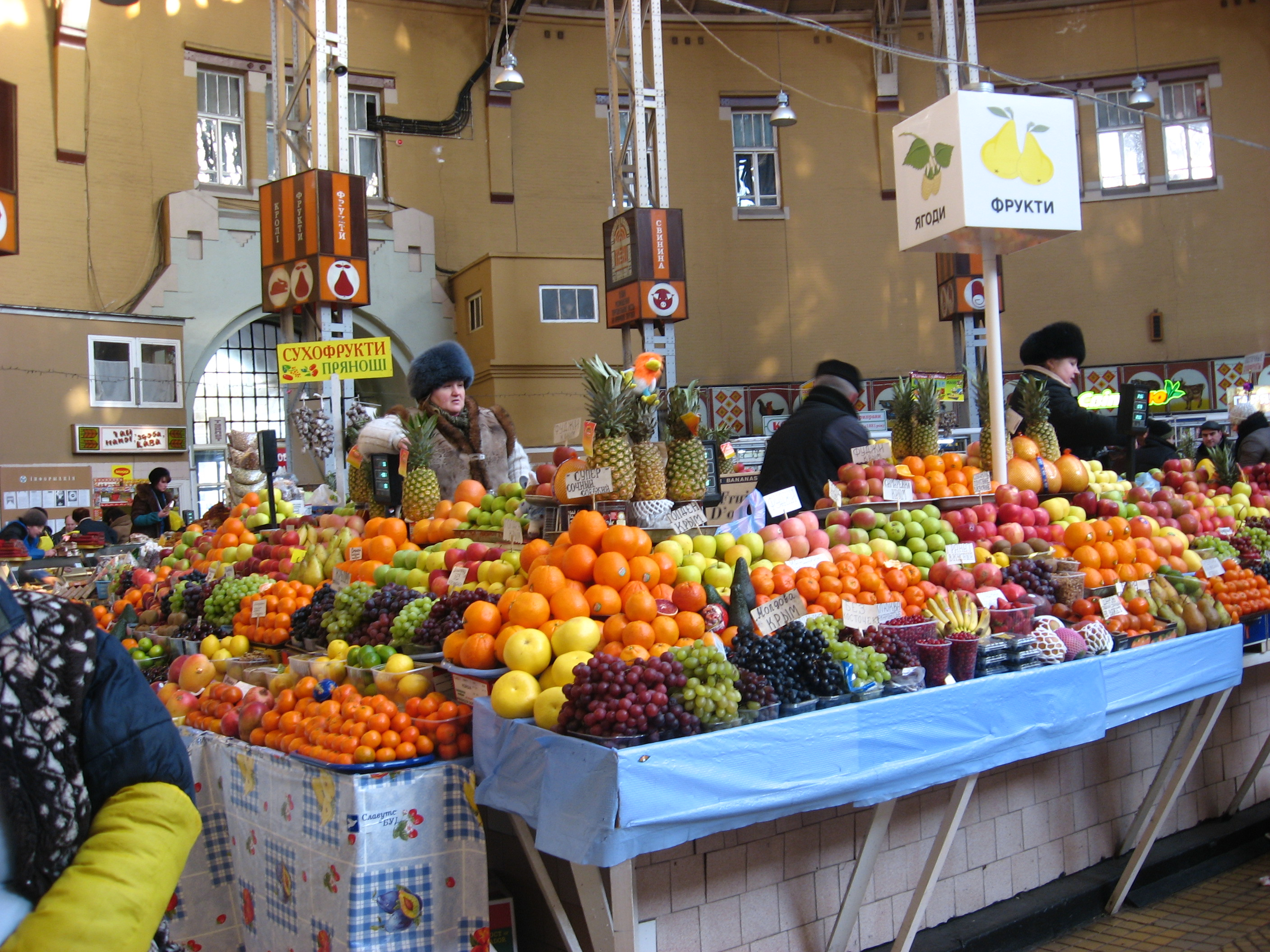

The Bessarabskyi Market (Ukrainian: Бессарабський ринок, romanized: Bessarabs'kyi rynok), or Besarabskyi Market (Ukrainian: Бесарабський ринок), also referred to as the Bessarabka (Ukrainian: Бессарабка), is a market hall located in the center of Kyiv on the Bessarabska Square at the southwest end of the city's main thoroughfare, the Khreshchatyk. Constructed from 1910 to 1912 to a design of Polish architect Henryk Julian Gay, the market features 896 square metres (9,640 ft^{2}) of market space.

Its name originates from Bessarabia, a region conquered by the Russian Empire during the Russo-Turkish Wars and now partially located in southwestern Ukraine on the territory of the Odesa Oblast (province).

== See also ==
- Lazar Brodsky
- Market (place)
- Retail
