= The Wall of Remembrance of the Fallen for Ukraine =

Memorial in Kyiv, Ukraine

Coordinates: 50°27′19″N 30°31′20″E

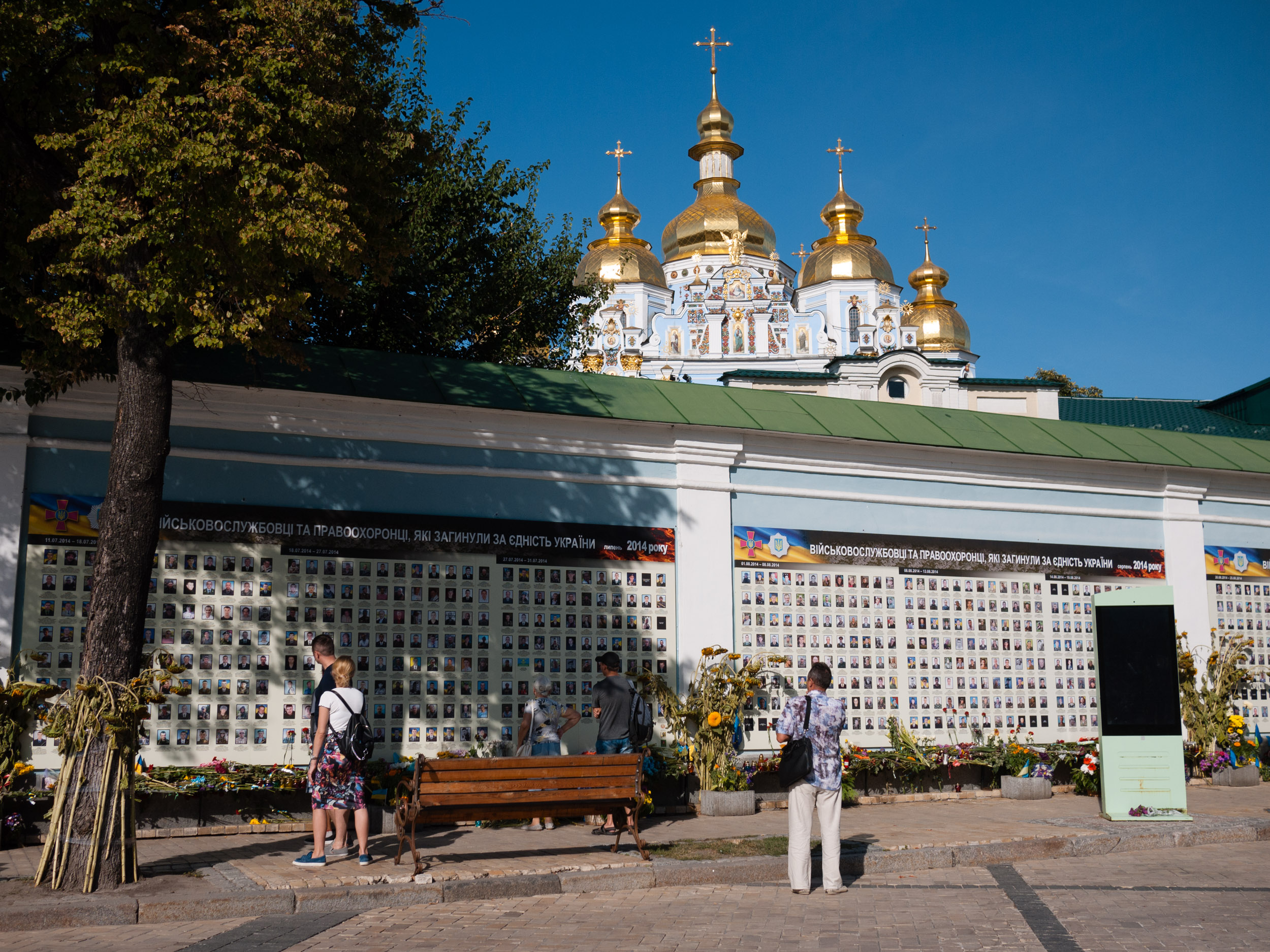
Wall of memory. August 29, 2019.

The Wall of Remembrance of the Fallen for Ukraine (Ukrainian: Стіна пам'яті загиблих за Україну, romanized: Stina pamiati zahyblykh za Ukrainu) is the wall of the Mykhailivsky Golden-Domed Monastery along Trohsvyatitelska Street near Mykhailivska Square, Kyiv.

It was implemented as a joint work of the Ukrainian Orthodox Church of the Kyiv Patriarchate, the National Military History Museum of Ukraine, the editorial board of the book "Memory of the Fallen for Ukraine" and the historical and cultural society "Amulet of Time". In 2020, the Wall of Remembrance was renovated. 4500 new photos were added.

== History ==
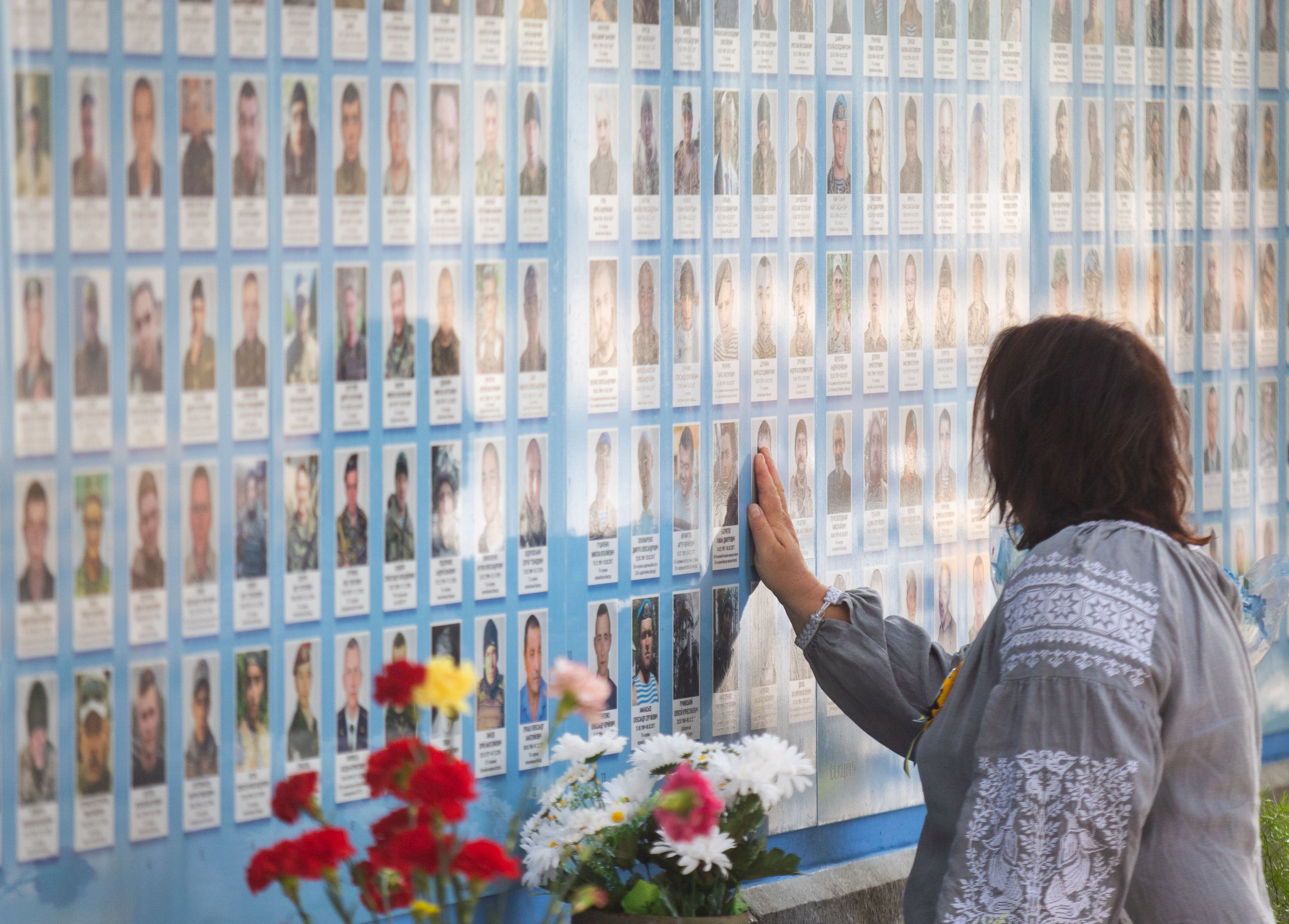

On August 20, 2020, the head of the OCU (ukr: ПЦУ), Metropolitan Epiphanius, consecrated the renovated stands of the Wall of Memory, which housed almost 4,500 new photographs.

== Events related to the wall ==
Not far from the wall, during the war, there was a strong tradition of commemorating those killed in the anniversary of the fiercest fighting. In particular, every year at the end of August, on the anniversary of the Ukrainian military and volunteers leaving the Ilovaisk pocket, volunteers of the Evacuation 200 mission from the Citadel IADF carry out the work of their mobile exhibition "Memory Block" during the evening and night.
