= Saint Michael's Square =

Square in Old Kyiv, Ukraine

- Public square
- {{{other_names}}}
- Михайлівська площа
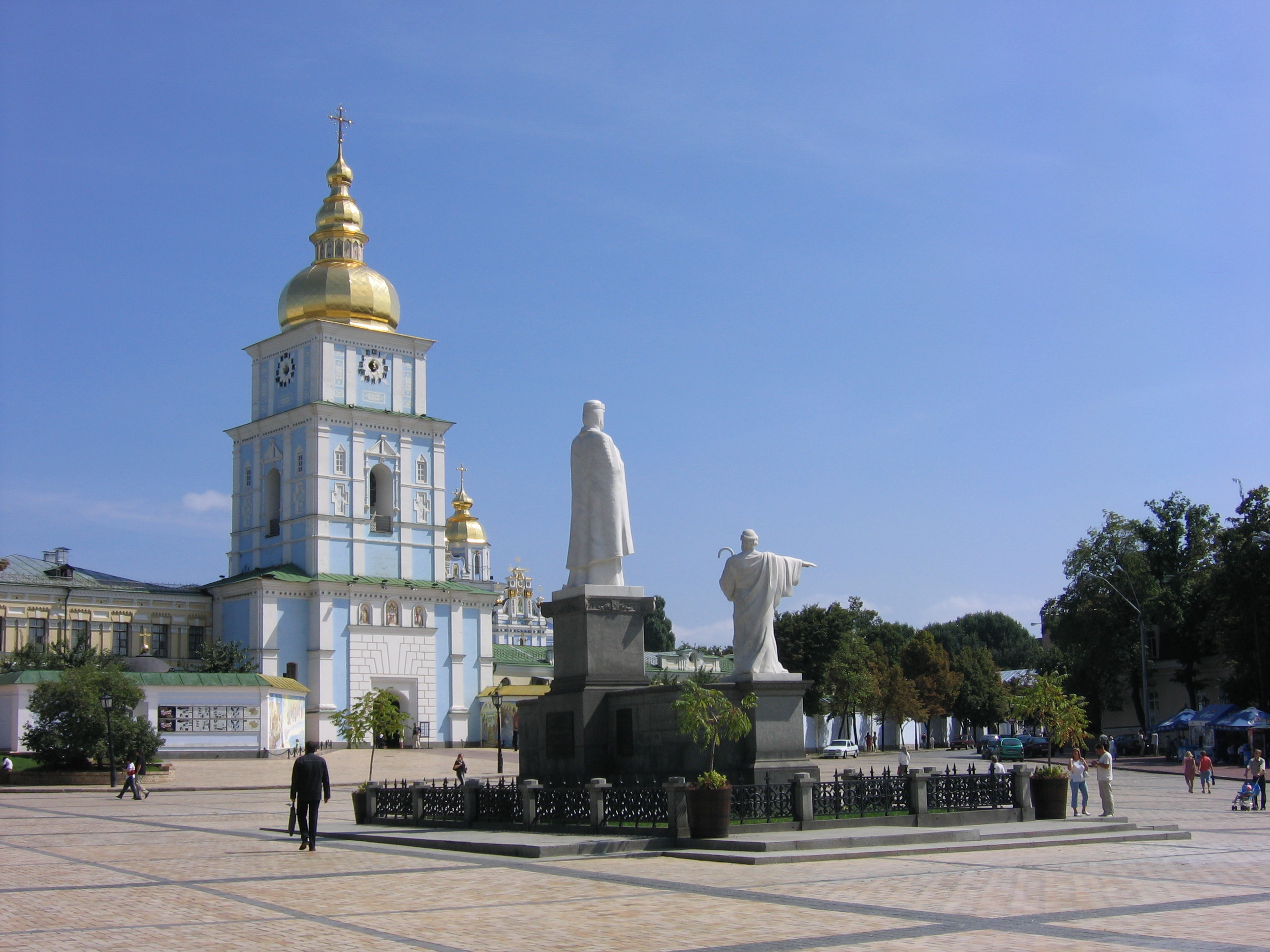
- Features: Saint Michael's Golden-Domed Monastery; Princess Olha Monument; Holodomor Victims Memorial; The Wall of Remembrance of the Fallen for Ukraine; Destroyed Russian military equipment exhibition
- Interactive map of Saint Michael's Square
- Coordinates: 50.4555°N 30.5210°E

Saint Michael's Square (Ukrainian: Михайлівська площа, romanized: Mykhailivska ploshcha) is a square in Old Kyiv, Ukraine. Located in the Shevchenkivskyi District of Kyiv, the square lies in front of Saint Michael's Golden-Domed Monastery. It is located about 300 m (1,000 ft) northeast of Sophia Square, to which it is connected by Volodymyrskyi Passage, and about 450 m (1,500 ft) northwest of Maidan Nezalezhnosti, to which it is connected by Michael Street.

On the square is a monument to Princess Olha, Andrew the Apostle, and Saints Cyril and Methodius. There is a memorial to the victims of the Holodomor in front of the monastery. Also, one of the monastery's external walls bordering the square serves as The Wall of Remembrance of the Fallen for Ukraine, a Russo-Ukrainian War memorial.

The square served as one of the fan zones during the Eurovision Song Contest 2017. Since May 2022 it hosts destroyed Russian military equipment exhibition that features Russian military equipment captured and destroyed during the 2022 Russian invasion of Ukraine.
