= Bessarabska Square =

Square in Kyiv, Ukraine

Coordinates: 50°26′32″N 30°31′14″E

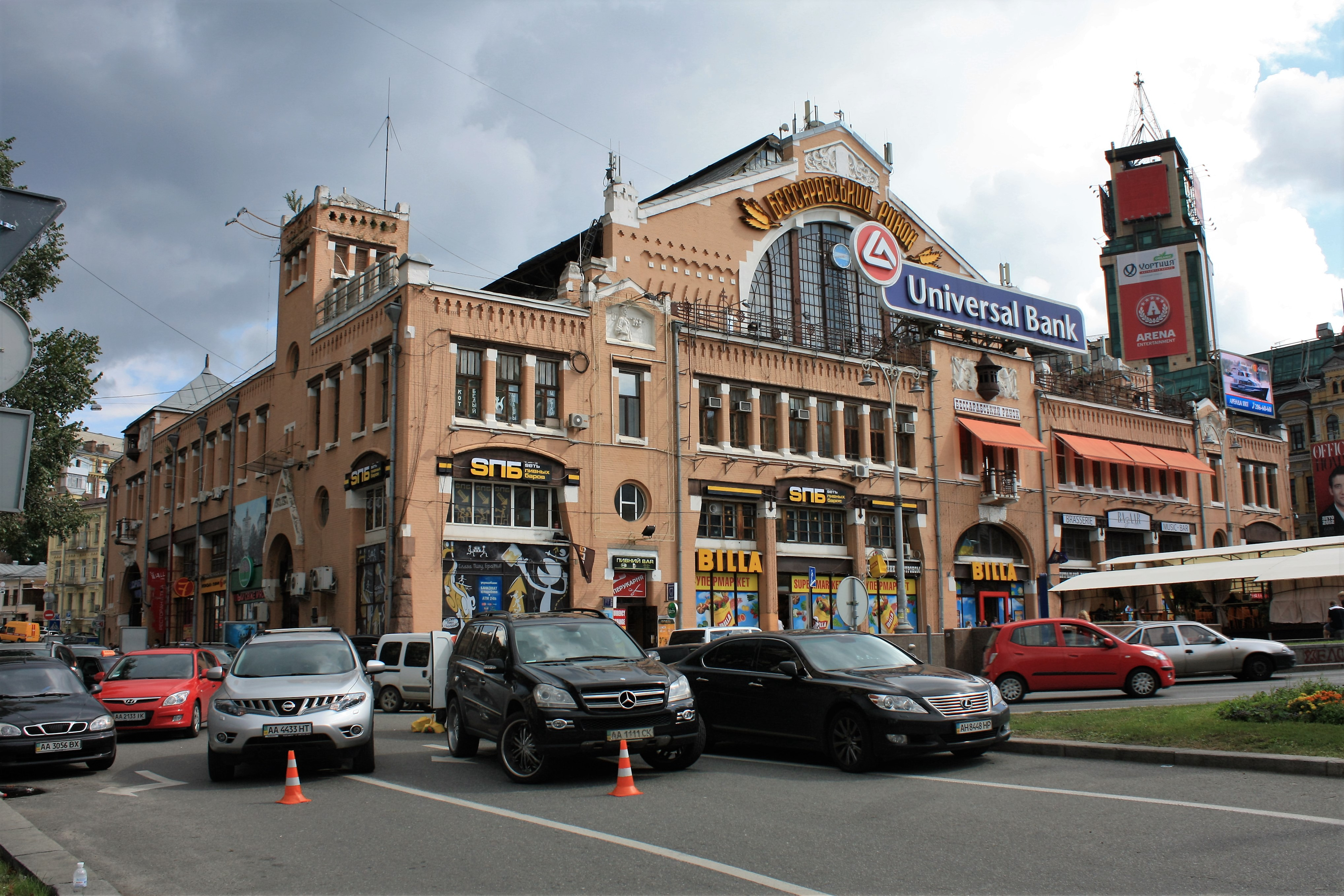
The Besarabskyi Market (1910-1912) was designed in the Modern style with constructivist elements.

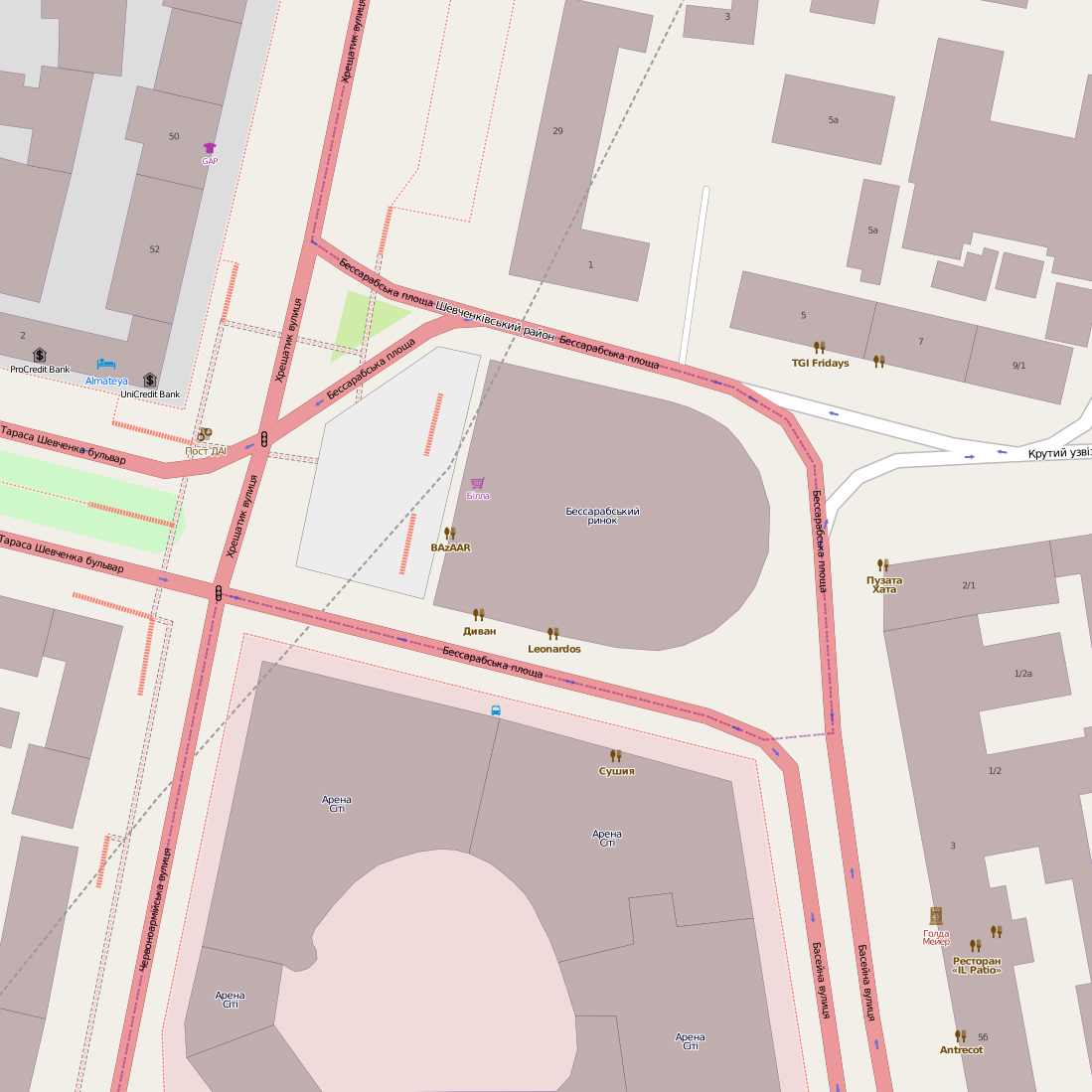
Diagram of the Bessarabska Square with the surrounding four streets.

The Bessarabska Square (Ukrainian: Бессарабська площа, Bessarabska ploshcha) is a square located at the southwest end of Khreshchatyk, the main thoroughfare of Kyiv, the capital of Ukraine. It is located in the city's Shevchenkivskyi District (district), at the busy intersection of Khreshchatyk, Taras Shevchenko Boulevard, Velyka Vasylkivska Street, and the Krutyi Descent streets.

Until the late 1840s, the square was located on the outskirts of town, where immigrants from Bessarabia in the southern regions of Ukraine would come to sell their products. Nowadays, the Bessarabska Square is one of three squares of the Khreshchatyk street complex, the others being the Maidan Nezalezhnosti and the European Square, located in the street's center and northeastern end, respectively.

== Attractions ==
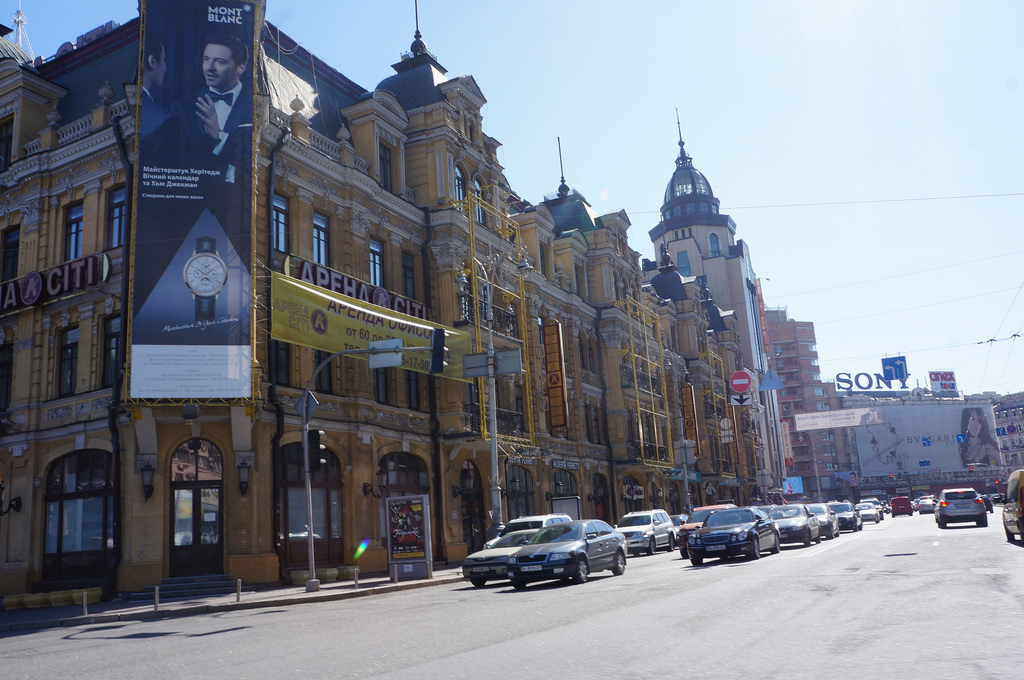
Arena City shopping mall on Bessarabska Square

The Bessarabska Square, named for the large indoor Besarabsky Market (1910–1912) located at its northern end, offers a few attractions: the relatively new office and shopping Mandarin Plaza complex, which is located on the southern end of the square, and the Metrohrad Shopping Complex (built in 2001) located underground, near the Khreshchatyk metro station. Kyiv's main monument to Vladimir Lenin was also located on the square on the Taras Shevchenko Boulevard until it was pulled down and destroyed by anti-Government protestors in December 2013.

The square is also accessible by two other Kyiv Metro stations which are located in the square's vicinity, the Palats Sportu ( Syretsko–Pecherska line) and Ploshcha Lva Tolsoho ( Obolonsko–Teremkivska line) stations, respectively.

== Former names ==
Before the Besarabsky Market was built in the early 1910s, the square was known by two different names:

- Universytetska Square (Ukrainian: Університетська площа, University Square) during the mid-19th century, as it was located on the route to the Taras Shevchenko National University of Kyiv from the Lypky neighborhood,
- Bohdan Khmelnytsky Square (Ukrainian: площа Б. Хмельницького) during 1869-1881. A monument dedicated to the hetman was supposed to be built on the square (it was instead erected on the Sofiiska Square in the city's upper town in 1888).
