= Israel Brodsky =

Russian businessman, founder of the "Sugar Empire" and philanthropist

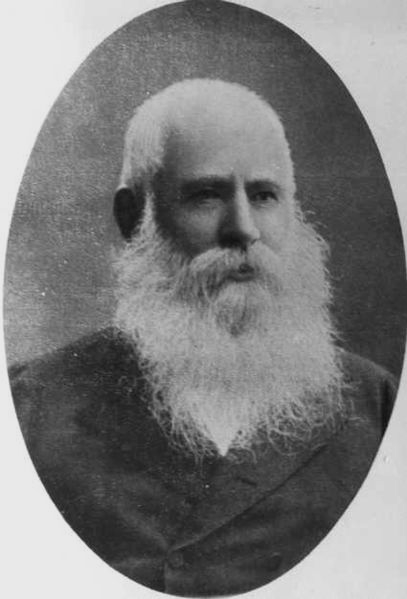
- Born: Israel Markovich Brodsky; 1823
- Died: October 11 [O.S. September 29] 1888; Russian Empire
- Occupations: businessman, philanthropist

Israel Markovich Brodsky (1823 - October 11 [O.S. September 29] 1888 ) was a Russian businessman, founder of the "Sugar Empire" and a philanthropist. In 1846 he founded a sugar refinery together with Peter Lopukhin. They operated it together until 1854 when he took over the full ownership. In April 1870, he purchased a site with a mill in Kiev and called it the Brodsky Mill. It stood until 2005 when two of the three buildings were destroyed.

In 1885 he built a Jewish hospital with 100 beds, which laid the foundation for what became the Kyiv Regional Hospital.

He was recognized by the Minister of Finance of the Russian Empire M. Bunge as a commercial advisor.
