= May 2023 European visits by Volodymyr Zelenskyy =

Bilateral meetings between the president of Ukraine and European leaders

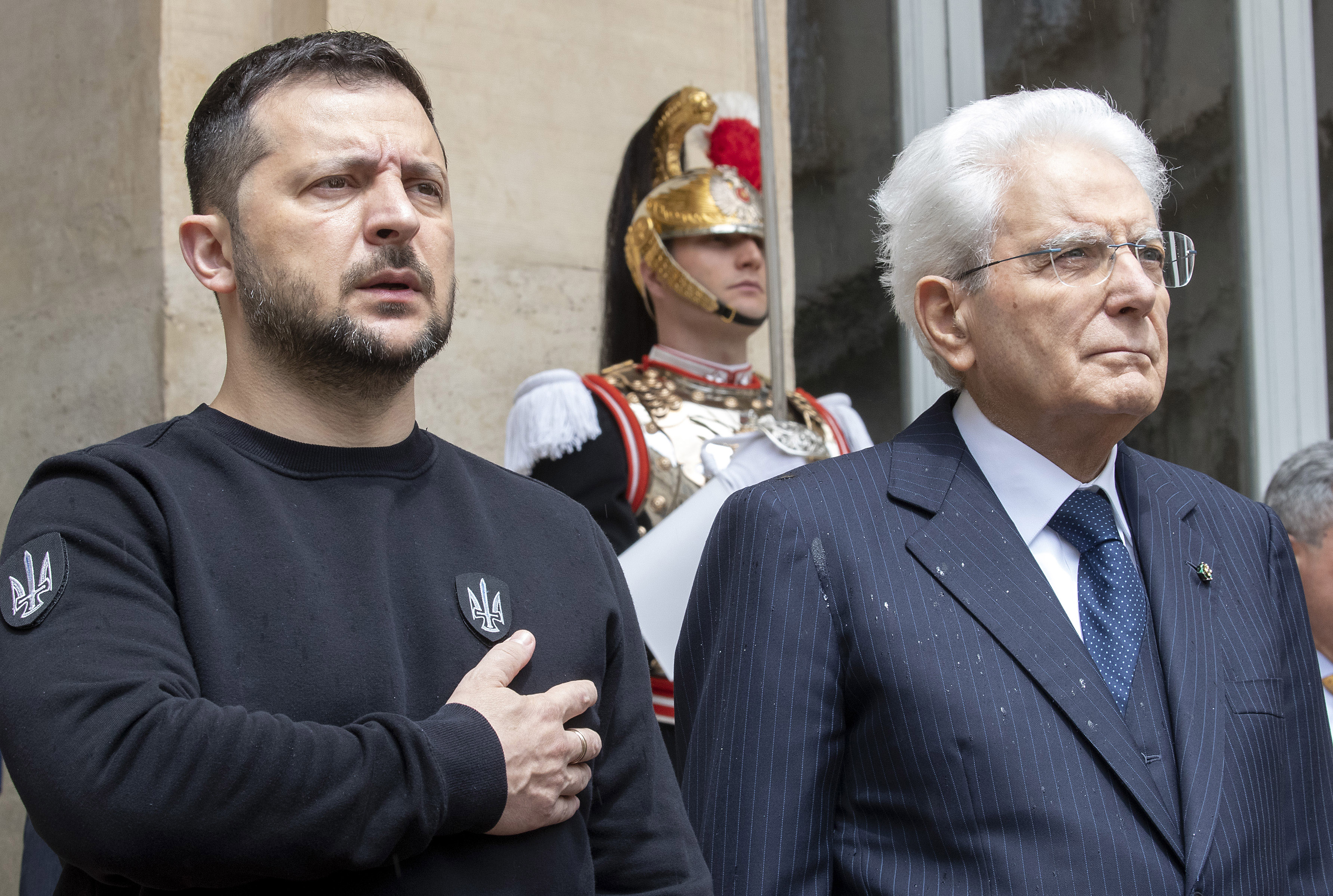
- Zelenskyy with Italian president Sergio Mattarella
- Date: 3–5 May 2023; 13–15 May 2023
- Location: Europe

In May 2023, Volodymyr Zelenskyy, the president of Ukraine, made multiple unannounced trips to several European countries. On 3 May, Zelenskyy travelled to Finland, where he met with the four prime ministers of the Nordic countries. On 4 May, Zelenskyy travelled to the Netherlands, meeting with the prime ministers of Belgium and the Netherlands, as well as visiting the International Criminal Court.

From 13 May to 15 May, Zelenskyy travelled to five European countries: Italy, Vatican City, Germany, France, and the United Kingdom, meeting with the leaders of each.

== Background ==
On 24 February 2022, Russia invaded Ukraine in a major escalation of the Russo-Ukrainian War. Zelenskyy has made a number of international trips since the beginning of the invasion, including to the United States in 2022, and the United Kingdom in February 2023.

== 3 May–5 May ==
=== Finland ===
Travelling to Helsinki onboard a Dutch government plane out of Poland, Zelenskyy was first received on 3 May by President of Finland, Sauli Niinistö at the Presidential Palace. He then attended a lunch with outgoing Finnish prime minister Sanna Marin, incoming prime minister Petteri Orpo, and foreign minister Pekka Haavisto. In the afternoon a Nordic-Ukrainian summit was held, with dignitaries from all five Nordic countries meeting with Zelenskyy including the prime ministers of Sweden, Norway, Denmark and Iceland as well as Marin. Topics endorsed by the Nordic countries included more military and humanitarian aid, as well as support for an eventual membership in NATO and the European Union for Ukraine.

=== Netherlands ===
On the same Dutch plane which took him to Finland, Zelenskyy arrived at Schiphol airport in Amsterdam on 3 May. The following day, he met with Prime Minister of the Netherlands Mark Rutte.

The timing of the trip was criticized as the Dutch day to honor victims of World War II, Remembrance of the Dead, is held on 4 May. Criticism was directed at Rutte, accusing him of focusing on Ukrainian, rather than Dutch, casualties of war. Opposition parties such as the PVV and FvD parties voiced criticisms, with the BBB party leader Caroline van der Plas boycotting a planned meeting with Zelenskyy. Rutte dismissed these criticisms, saying that if Zelenskyy "says he is coming, we will make time for it."

==== Visit to the International Criminal Court ====
On 4 May, Zelenskyy visited the International Criminal Court in The Hague, Netherlands, meeting with its leadership. He also had meetings with the Prime Minister Rutte and Prime Minister of Belgium Alexander De Croo. The court has previously issued arrest warrants for the president of Russia, Vladimir Putin, and his Children's Commissioner, Maria Lvova-Belova.

== 13 May–15 May ==
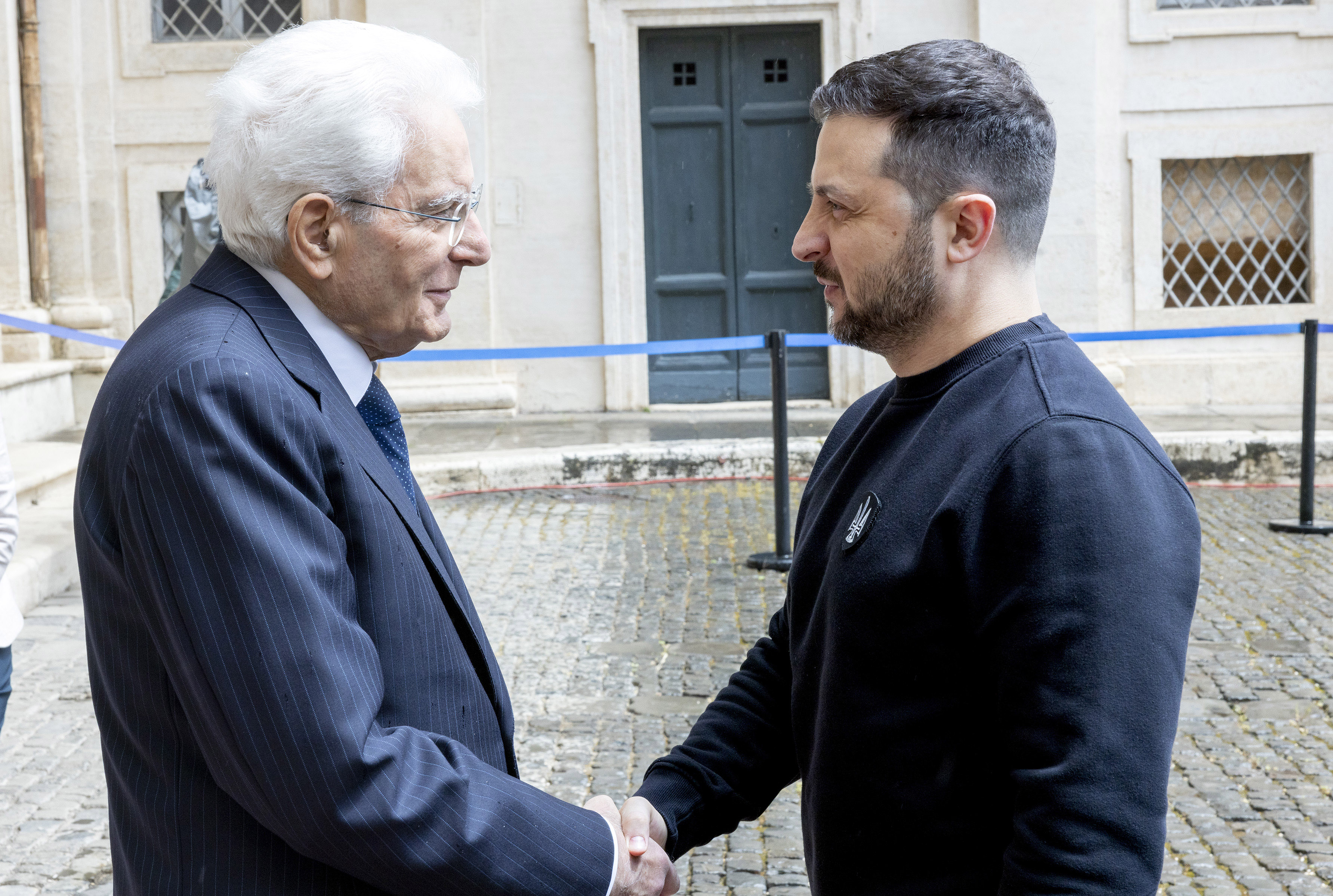
Zelenskyy and Mattarella in Rome on 13 May

=== Italy ===
Arriving in Rome via Ciampino airport on 13 May, Zelenskyy was received by foreign minister Antonio Tajani. He then traveled to Quirinal Palace and met with President Sergio Mattarella. Mattarella told Zelenskyy that "[w]e are fully at you side. Zelenskyy then met with Prime Minister Giorgia Meloni at the Chigi Palace. Since the invasion began, Italy had provided Ukraine with an estimated €1 billion in military and humanitarian aid. Meloni stated, after an hour-long meeting between the two, that Italy would continue to provide aid to Ukraine and further support the country's ambitions to join the European Union. The assurances came during a time when further aid to Ukraine is a fraught subject in Italy, with Meloni's government coalition partners expressing concern over it while their past ties to the Kremlin worried some observers.

=== Vatican City ===
Travelling by car from Rome to Vatican City, Zelenskyy met with Pope Francis where the two discussed paths for peace in Ukraine's ongoing war with Russia over a 40-minute long meeting. The meeting came after comments made by Francis earlier in the year where he hinted as at the Vatican serving in a mediation role for peace talks between Russia and Ukraine. During the meeting, Zelenskyy asked Francis to support Ukraine's ten-point plan for peace and asked him to condemn war crimes committed during the war. The two also discussed the humanitarian situation facing children in Ukraine, with an estimated ten-thousand being deported into Russia during the war, something Francis had expressed concerns over before.

=== Germany ===
Zelenskyy's visit to Germany was nearly canceled after leaks online were deemed a potential security threat to the trip. The Berlin newspaper, B.Z., first reported the trip to the city on 4 May, citing the leaked information from a police officer in the Berlin police. The department opened an investigation shortly afterward.

On 14 May, Zelenskyy arrived in Berlin via a Luftwaffe jet departing from Rome. Germany is an important supplier of arms and aid to Ukraine, second in spending only to the United States, but was initially more hesitant to send lethal weaponry. The day prior to Zelenskyy's arrival, Germany announced a new aid package to the country totaling €2.7 billion. Zelenskyy was received by President Frank-Walter Steinmeier, then met with Chancellor Olaf Scholz. During a press conference with Scholz, Zelenskyy praised Germany's new aid package. Scholz meanwhile, in response to a question over Germany being Ukraine's second top backer behind the United States, said that his country was looking to be first in aid.

Zelenskyy and Scholz then flew together to Aachen. Zelenskyy "and the Ukrainian people" were awarded the Charlemagne Prize for their efforts to "support and defend European values." He also met with President of the European Commission Ursula von der Leyen.

=== France ===
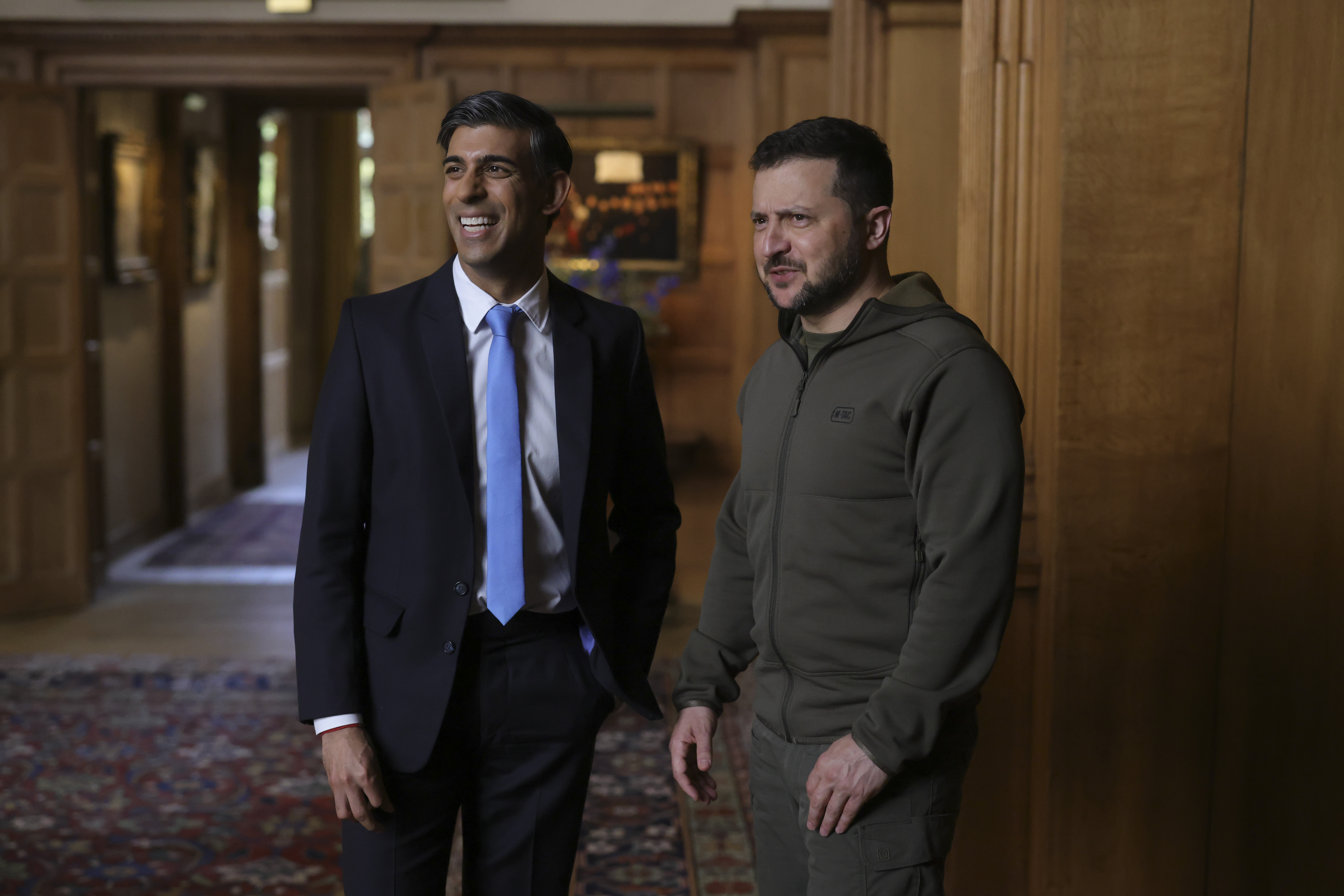
Zelenskyy and Sunak at the Chequers estate on 15 May

Leaving Germany on the night of 14 May, Zelenskyy departed on a French government jet and landed in Paris. Zelenskyy met with President Emmanuel Macron at the Élysée Palace over a three-hour dinner, with one-hour just between the two leaders. Macron made assurances of more deliveries to Ukraine of air defense systems, tanks, and armored vehicles, including French AMX-10 RCs, to be announced in the following weeks.

=== United Kingdom ===
On 15 May, Zelenskyy arrived at Chequers in the United Kingdom and met with Prime Minister Rishi Sunak. The first world leader Sunak hosted at Chequers, the two embraced in the garden before holding two-hour-long talks inside. The two discussed fighter jet shipments, while Sunak promised more unmanned aerial drones and air defense missiles, including Storm Shadow cruise missiles.

== Analysis ==
The trips to the western and northern European countries were analysed by observers as an attempt by Zelenskyy to ensure continued military, diplomatic, and humanitarian support in Ukraine's war against Russia. The trip was seen as a success, with promised aid from multiple countries, even from those that have been more hesitant to continue arming Ukraine previously. The trip was made within the context of an expected counteroffensive beginning from Ukraine, centered around the battle for control of Bakhmut and the Donbas region. Zelenskyy, on arriving in France near the end of his tour of Europe stated his goal of the trip: "With each visit, the defensive and offensive capabilities of Ukraine increase" and that "[t]he connection with Europe is getting stronger, and the pressure on Russia is increasing."

Zelenskyy stated his hopes to build a "fighter jet coalition" during his tour of Europe, with the aim of securing more of the weaponry described as vital to fight against Russian air power. The governments of the United Kingdom and the Netherlands agreed to this international coalition, while Germany as well as F-16 supplier, the United States, did not immediately change their position.

== Aftermath ==
The following week, Zelenskyy undertook more international visits widely seen as efforts to acquire more military and humanitarian aid, as well as diplomatic support, for Ukraine. On 19 May, Zelenskyy travelled to Saudi Arabia, meeting with Crown Prince Mohammed bin Salman and attending the 2023 Arab League summit. The trip contrasted with the earlier European trip as Arab countries have taken a much more neutral position in the war, with some member states such as Syria receiving diplomatic and military assistance from Russia in the past. Zelenskyy departed Jeddah that night and travelled to Hiroshima, Japan, attending the 49th G7 summit.

On 19 May, President Biden reversed the United States's previous position, announcing they would join the effort to train Ukrainian pilots on flying F-16 fighter jets; a move expedited by a rise in support in Europe after Zelenskyy's trip through the continent earlier that month. The move was applauded by the Dutch and British governments, with plans for months-long training at a site outside of Ukraine in Europe being discussed. In July at the 2023 NATO summit in Vilnius, it was announced that 11 NATO countries had agreed to train F-16 pilots for Ukraine, with a site in Romania serving as the base for instruction.

== See also ==
- List of international presidential trips made by Volodymyr Zelenskyy
  - 2022 visit by Volodymyr Zelenskyy to the United States
  - 2023 visit by Volodymyr Zelenskyy to the United Kingdom
- 2023 visit by Joe Biden to Ukraine
- 2023 visit by Fumio Kishida to Ukraine
