= 2022 visit by Volodymyr Zelenskyy to the United States =

Bilateral meeting between the leaders of Ukraine and the United States

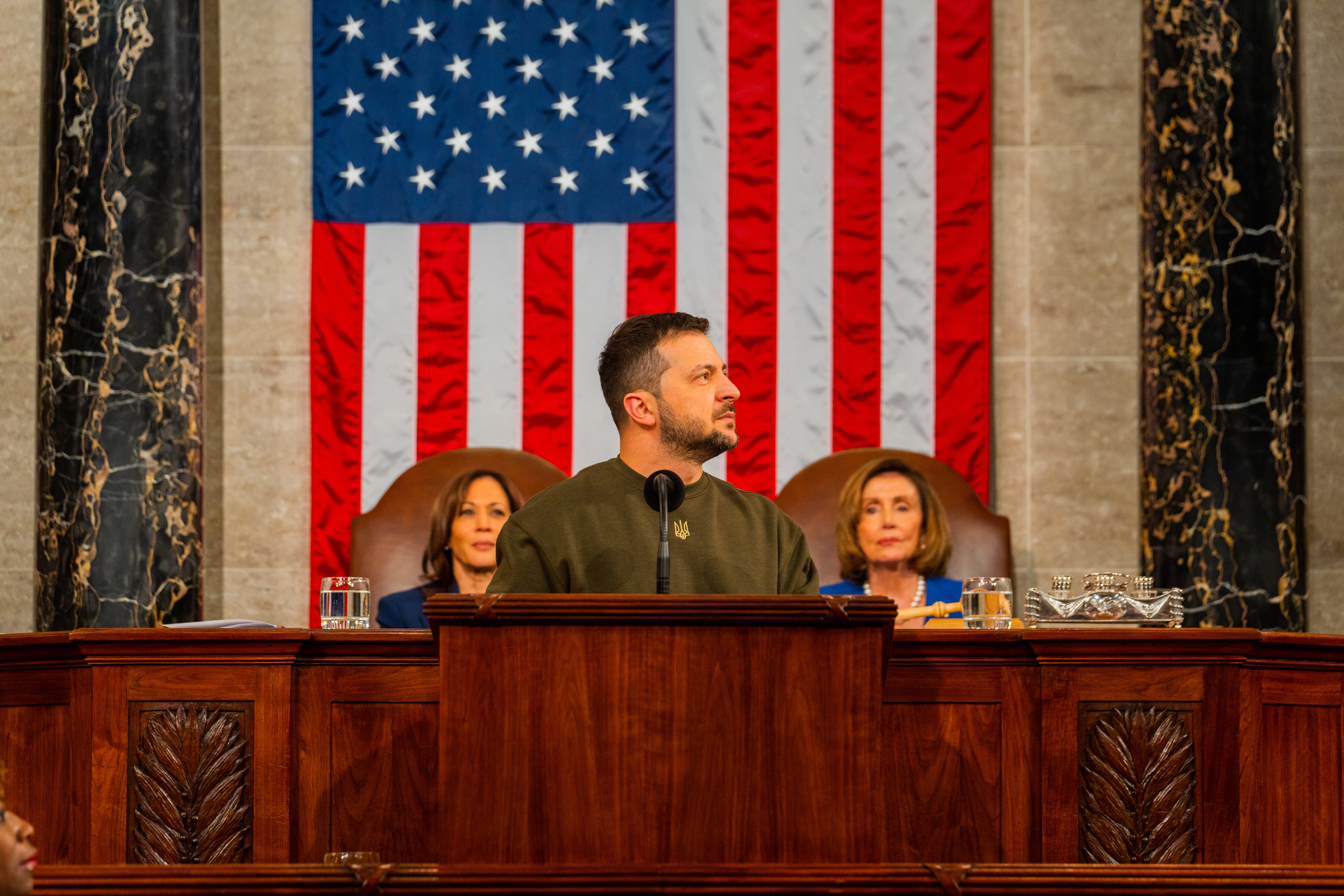
- President Zelenskyy delivering a speech to the United States Congress during his visit to the United States on 21 December
- Date: December 21–22, 2022
- Location: Washington, D.C., United States

On 21 December 2022, Volodymyr Zelenskyy, the president of Ukraine, visited the United States. During his 10-hour visit, Zelenskyy met with Joe Biden, the president of the United States, held a joint press conference, and addressed a joint session of the United States Congress. US Secretary of State Antony Blinken announced a US$1.85 billion military aid package for Ukraine ahead of Zelenskyy's visit. Zelenskyy's visit to Washington, D.C. was his first overseas trip since the Russian invasion of Ukraine in February 2022.

== Background ==
On 24 February 2022, Russia invaded Ukraine in a major escalation of the Russo-Ukrainian War. At the beginning of the invasion, Zelenskyy declined offers of evacuation from the United States. The United States assisted Ukraine and Zelenskyy by other means, with the US giving the most assistance to Ukraine throughout the invasion of any foreign nation—around US$50 billion at the time of Zelenskyy's visit.

This was Zelenskyy's first visit to the White House, although he had met with Biden's predecessor, Donald Trump, in 2019, "on the sidelines of the United Nations General Assembly's opening sessions in New York."

Informal discussions about the trip began on 11 December, and after the invitation was extended and accepted, planning began on 18 December. Zelenskyy travelled by train to Przemyśl, Poland, where he was joined by US ambassador Bridget Brink, "transported in a U.S. Embassy vehicle to an airport in Rzeszów," and then travelled, via a US Air Force jet typically used by Cabinet-level officials, to Joint Base Andrews.

== Visit to the United States ==
External videos
- Press conference with Zelenskyy and President Joe Biden, 21 December 2022, C-SPAN
- Press conference with Zelenskyy and House Speaker Nancy Pelosi, 21 December 2022, C-SPAN
- Zelenskyy's address to a joint meeting of the U.S. Congress, 21 December 2022, C-SPAN

=== Meeting with Joe Biden ===
Zelenskyy arrived in the country from Rzeszów, Poland aboard a United States Air Force C-40B. During his visit to the United States, Zelenskyy met with the president, Joe Biden. Biden pledged a Patriot missile system for the use of Ukraine against aircraft, ballistic, and cruise missiles. The Patriot system had been previously asked for by Ukraine.

Zelenskyy presented Biden with a medal that had been awarded to a Ukrainian officer responsible for a US-furnished HIMARS system "that the officer wanted Biden to have."

=== Speech to Congress ===
After meeting with Biden, Zelenskyy gave a speech, in English, to a joint session of the United States Congress. In his speech, Zelenskyy called for increased aid to Ukraine. Following his speech, Zelenskyy gave a Ukrainian flag signed by Ukrainian soldiers fighting at the Battle of Bakhmut to Vice-President of the United States Kamala Harris and Speaker of the United States House of Representatives Nancy Pelosi. In return, Pelosi presented Zelenskyy with a US flag, which had flown over the Capitol that day. Zelenskyy carried the flag with him as he departed the House chamber.

Pelosi later compared the visit to Winston Churchill's address to Congress,

== Reaction ==
The Associated Press, citing a security analyst, wrote "Zelenskyy's mission of keeping America engaged is a difficult one, but he is up to the task." David Sanger of the New York Times argued that Zelenskyy's true purpose was appealing "to the minority of Republicans who are reluctant to spend more in a conflict whose end is nowhere in sight..." To this end, Zelenskyy reminded Congress that Iran's assistance to Russia might ultimately impact close US ally Israel, essentially urging Congressmembers hesitant to invest more in Ukraine to see it as part of a broader defence of Western interests.

== Gallery ==
President Zelenskyy during 2022 trip to Washington

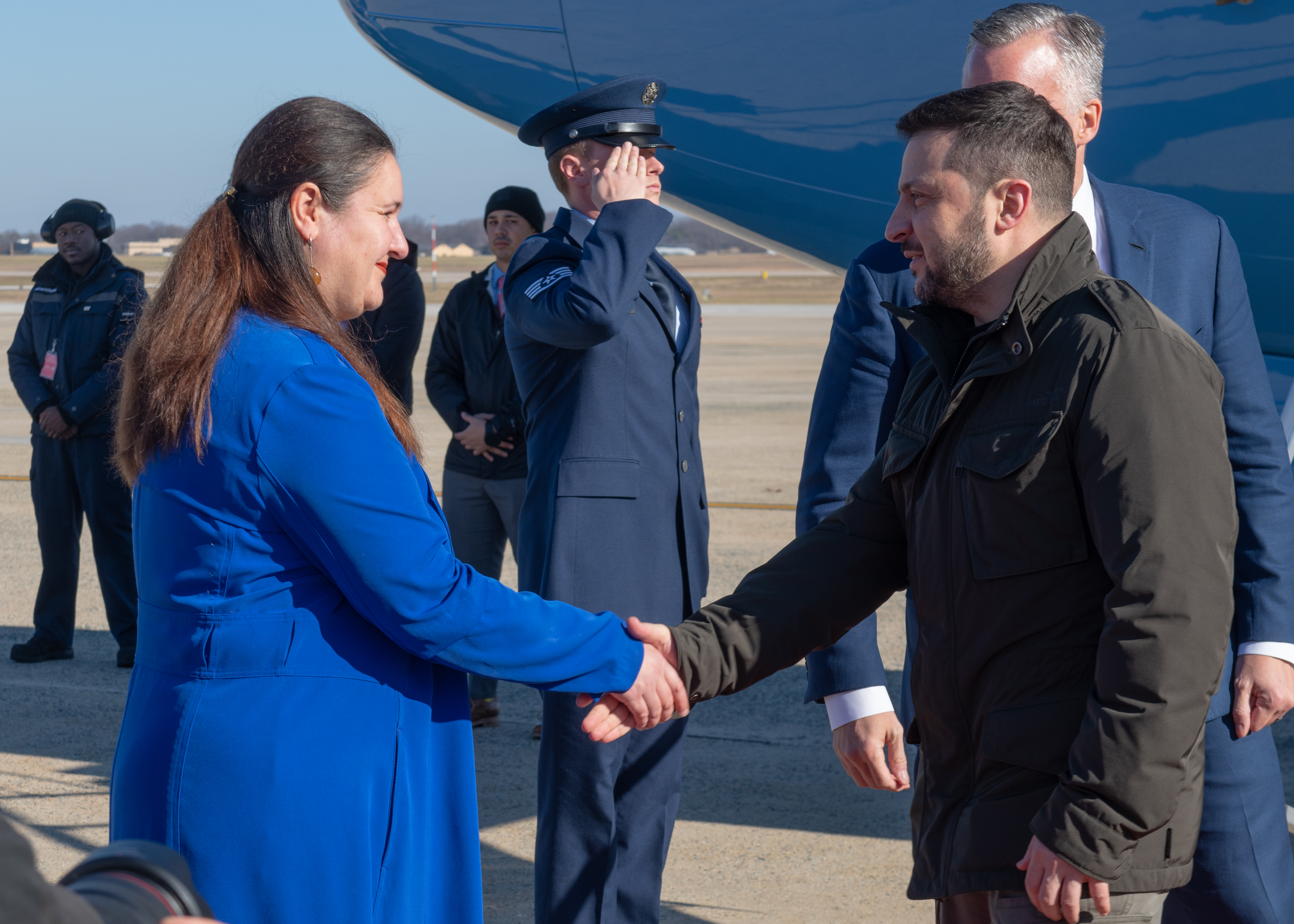
Zelenskyy greeted by Ambassador Oksana Markarova at Joint Base Andrews

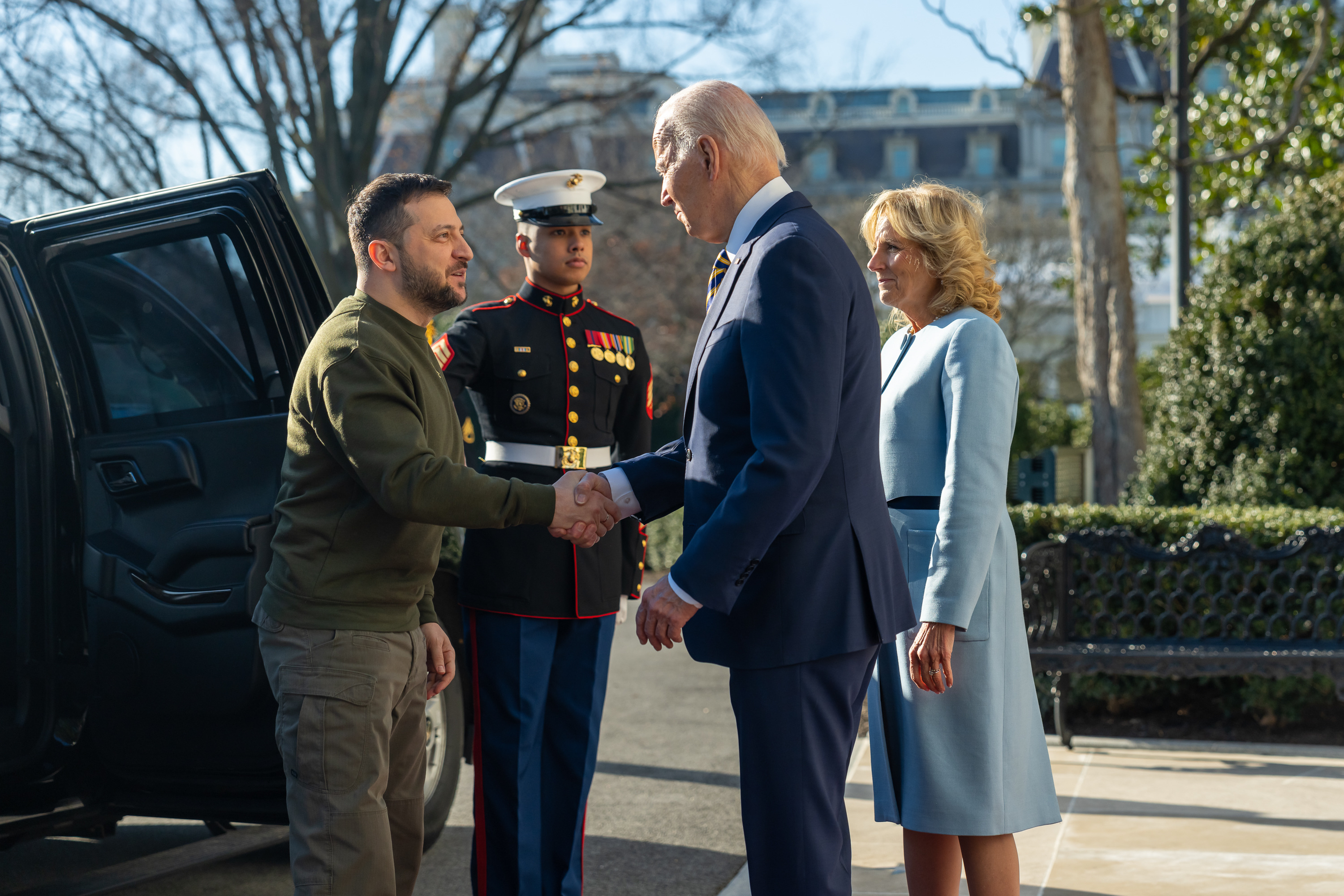
Zelenskyy greeted by President Joe Biden at the South Portico of the White House

Zelenskyy is received by President Joe Biden

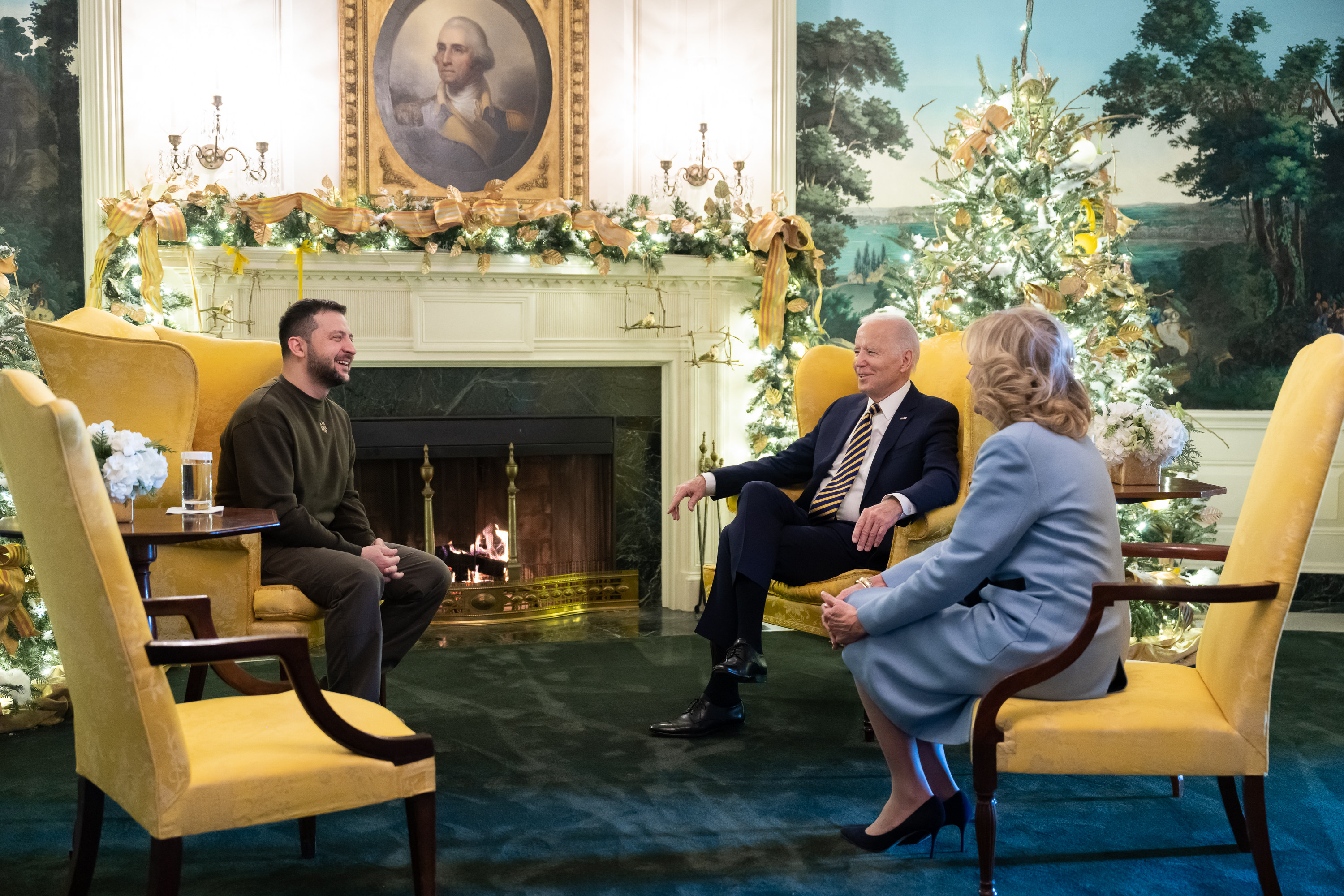
Zelenskyy and Biden in the Diplomatic Reception Room

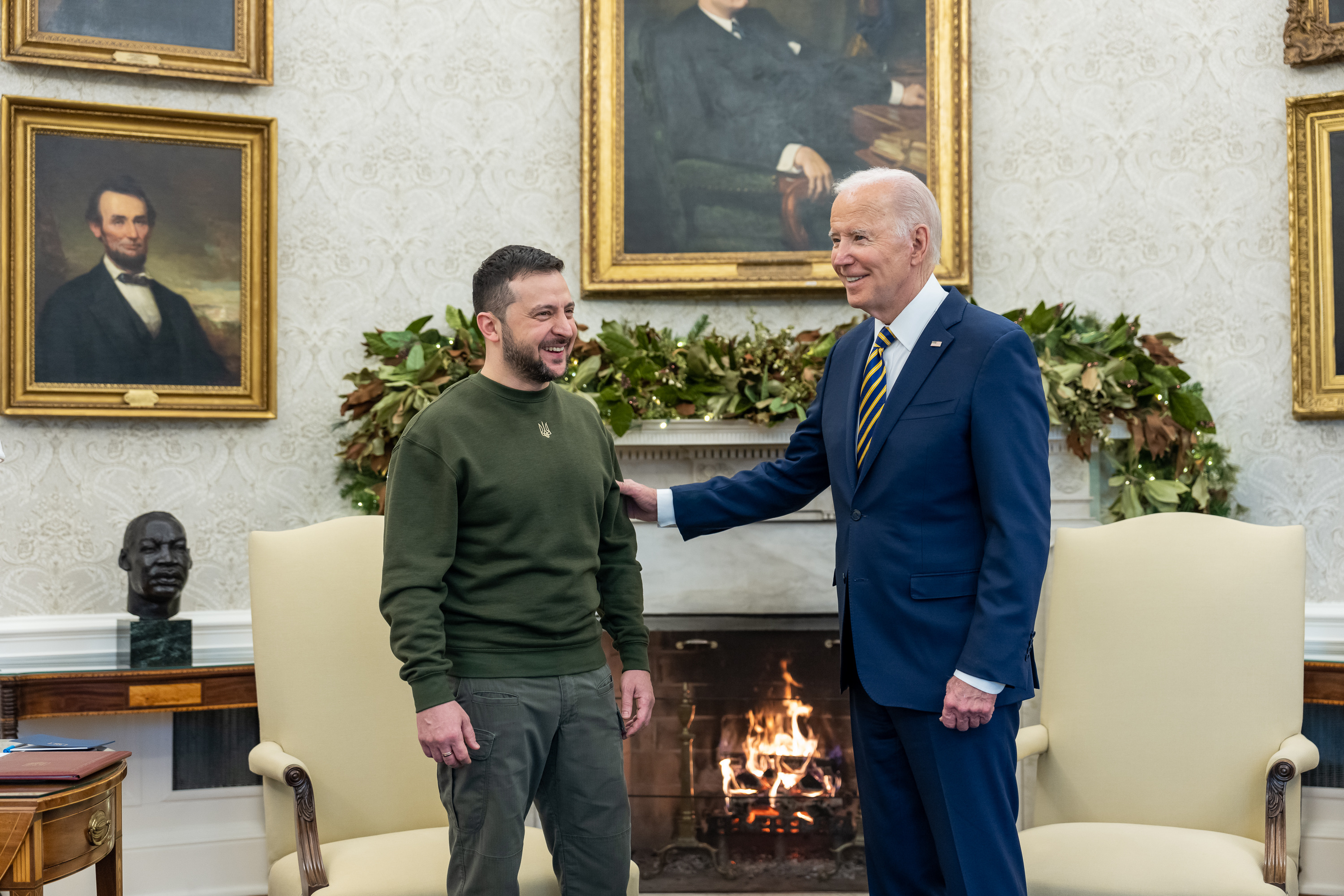
Zelenskyy and Biden in the Oval Office

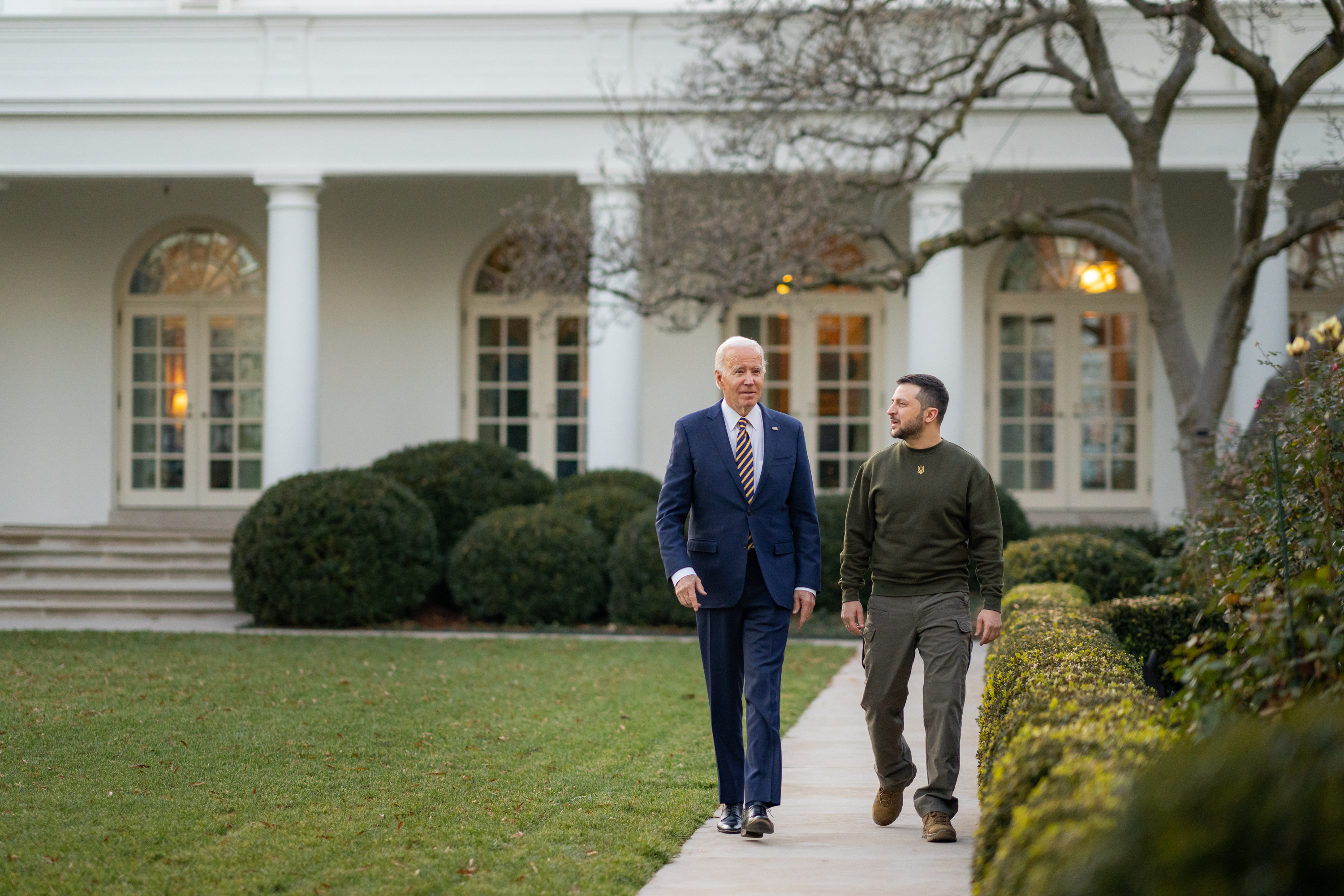
Zelenskyy and Biden in the Rose Garden

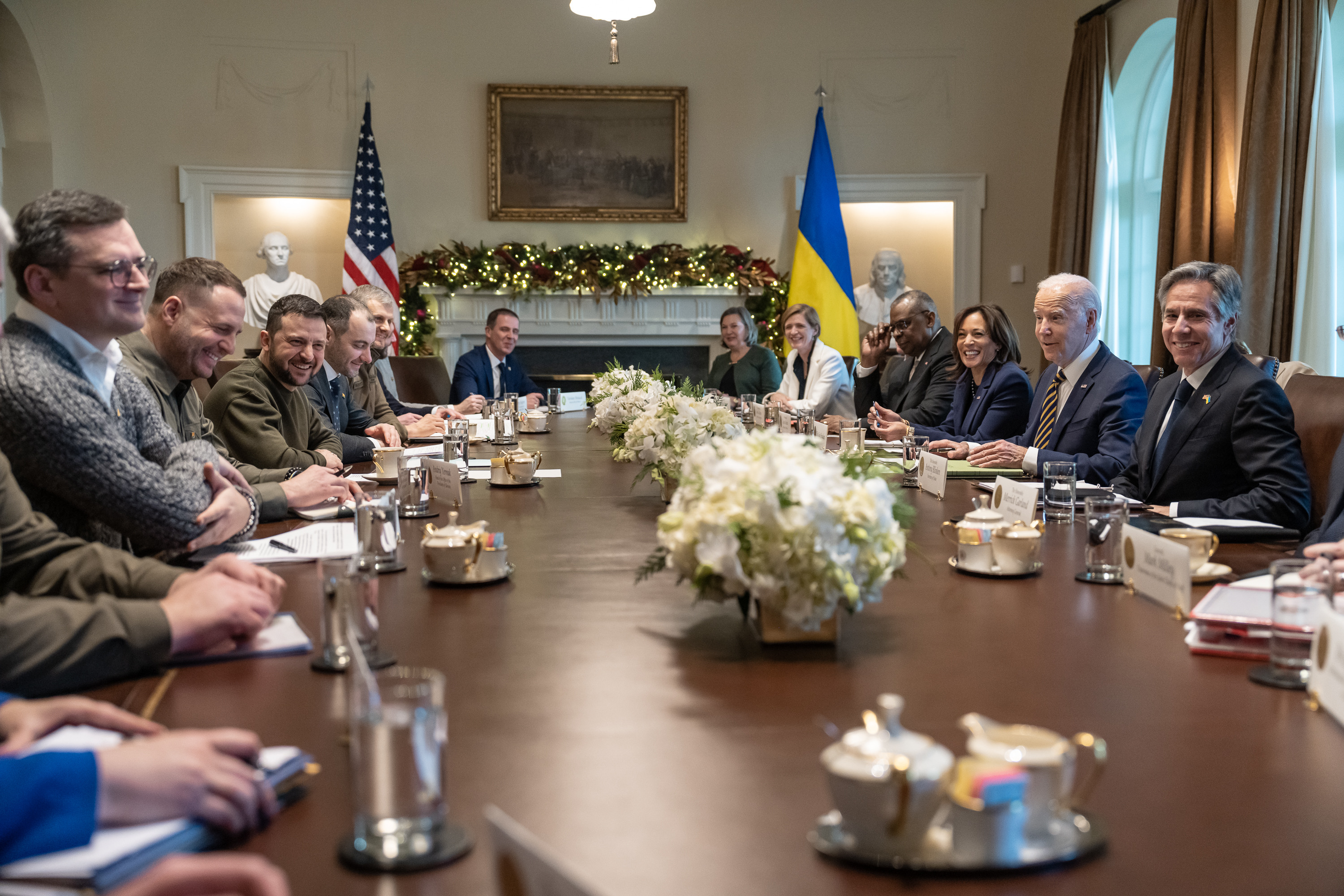
Zelenskyy and Biden in a bilateral meeting in the Cabinet Room

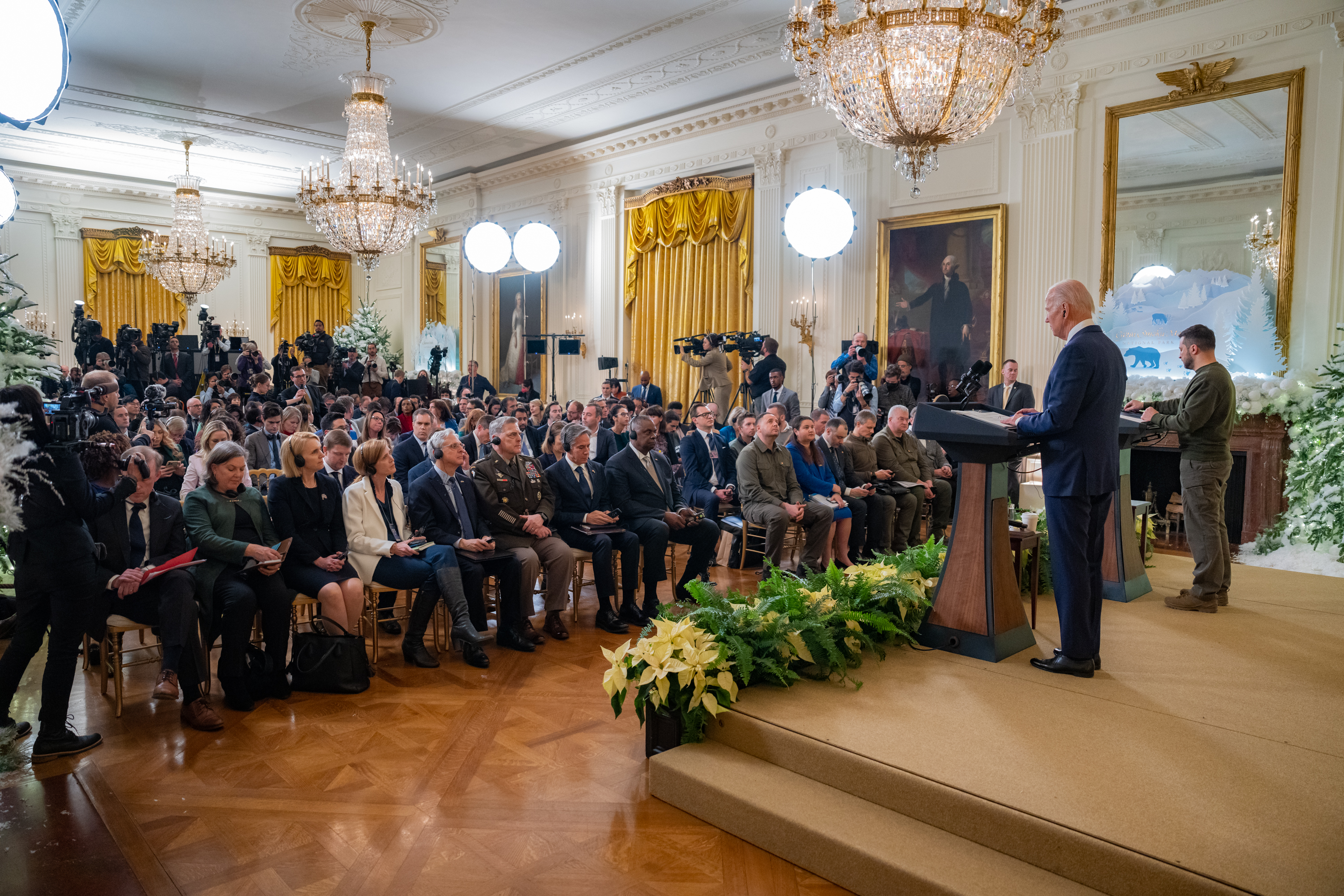
Zelenskyy and Biden at a press conference in the East Room

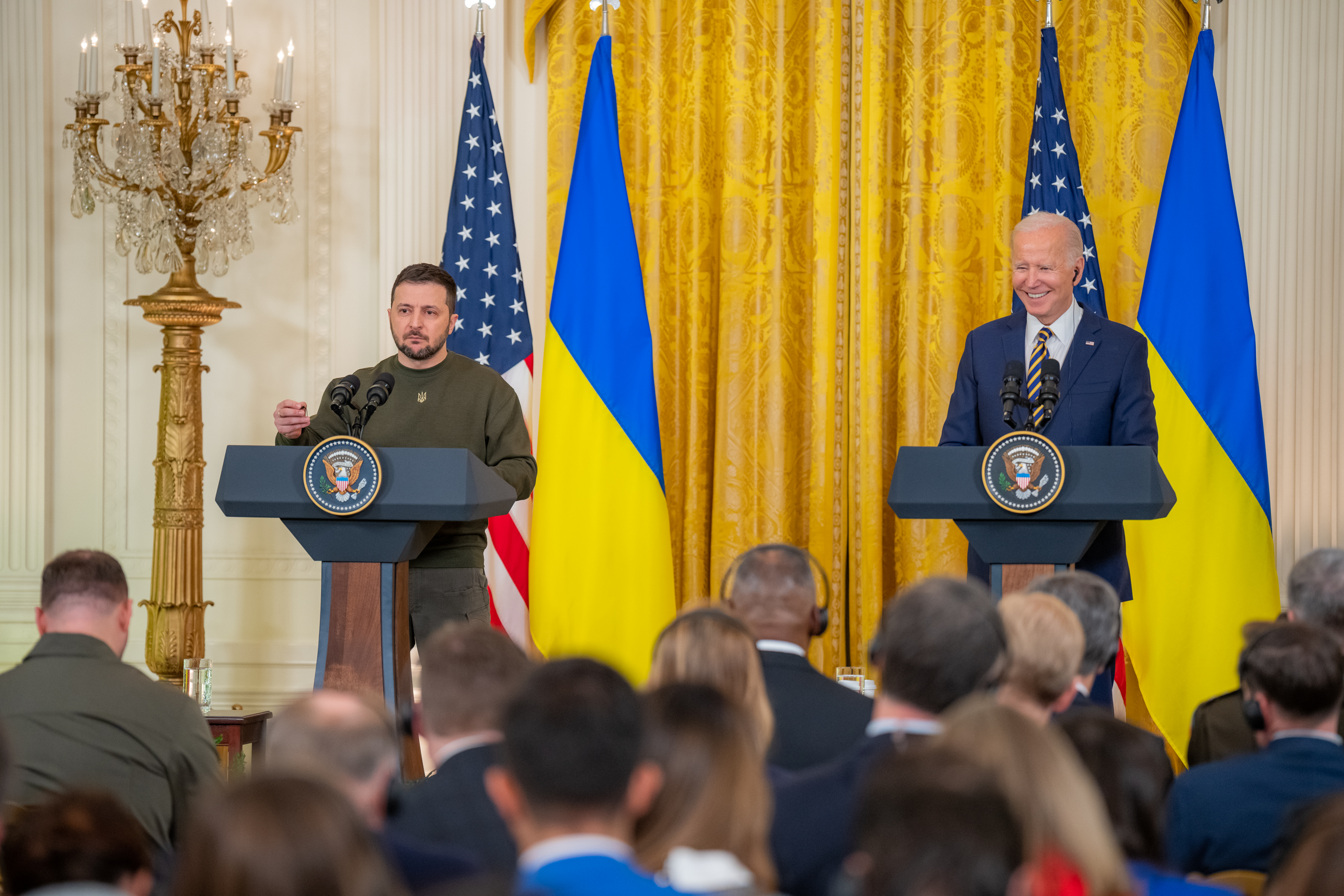
Joint press conference President Biden and President Volodymyr Zelenskyy

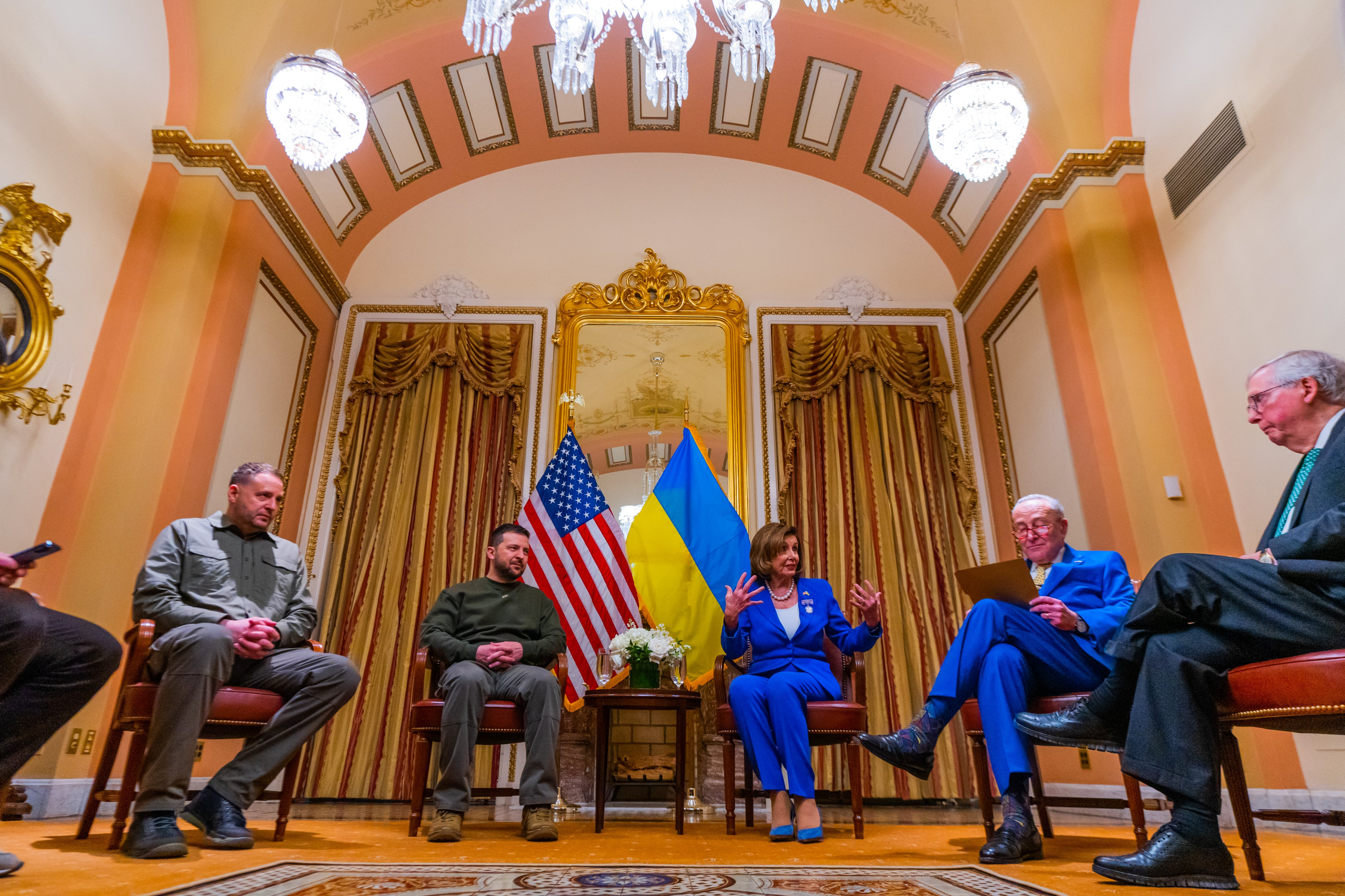
Zelenskyy, Nancy Pelosi, Chuck Schumer, Andriy Yermak and Mitch McConnell at the Capitol

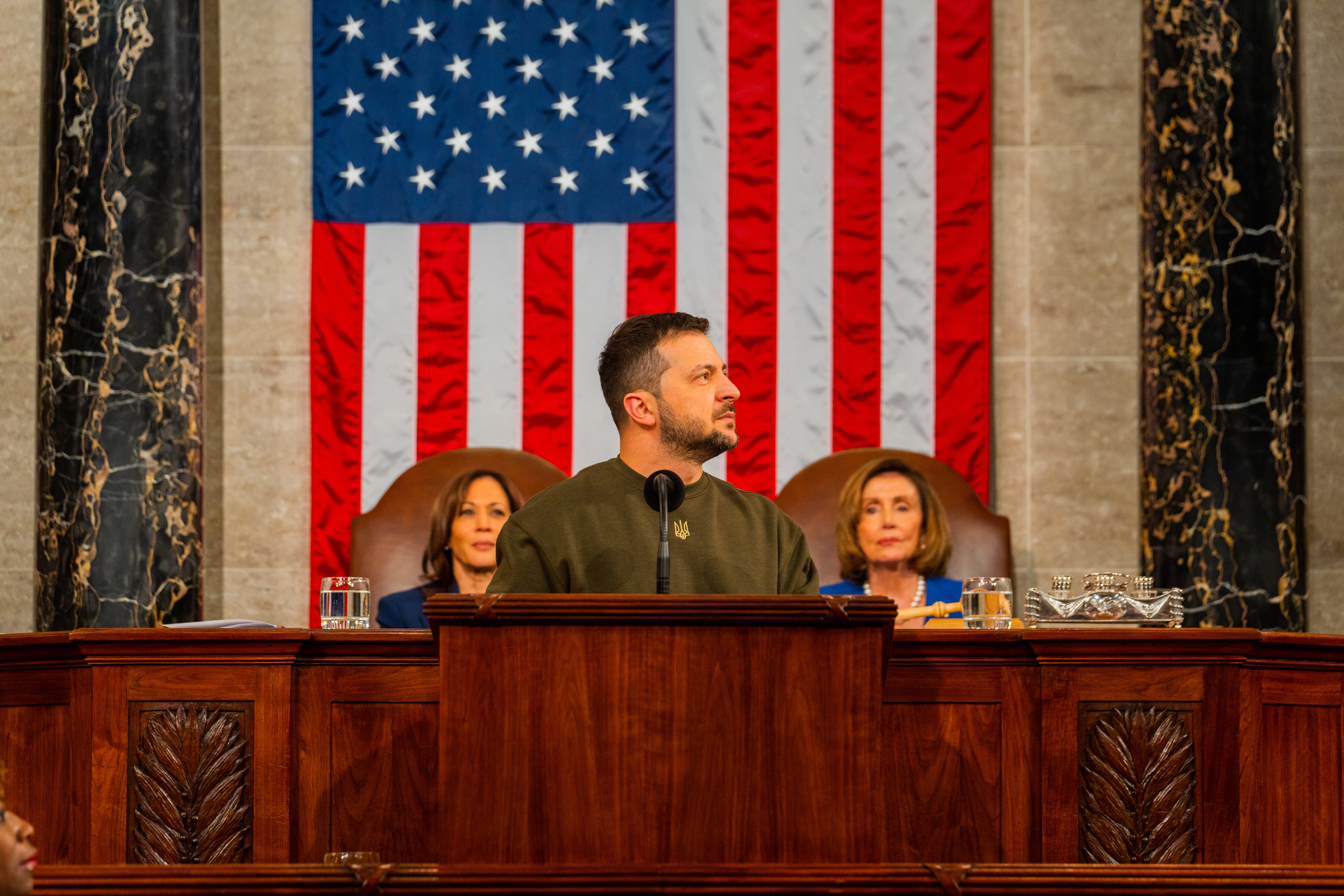
Zelenskyy giving a speech to a joint session of Congress

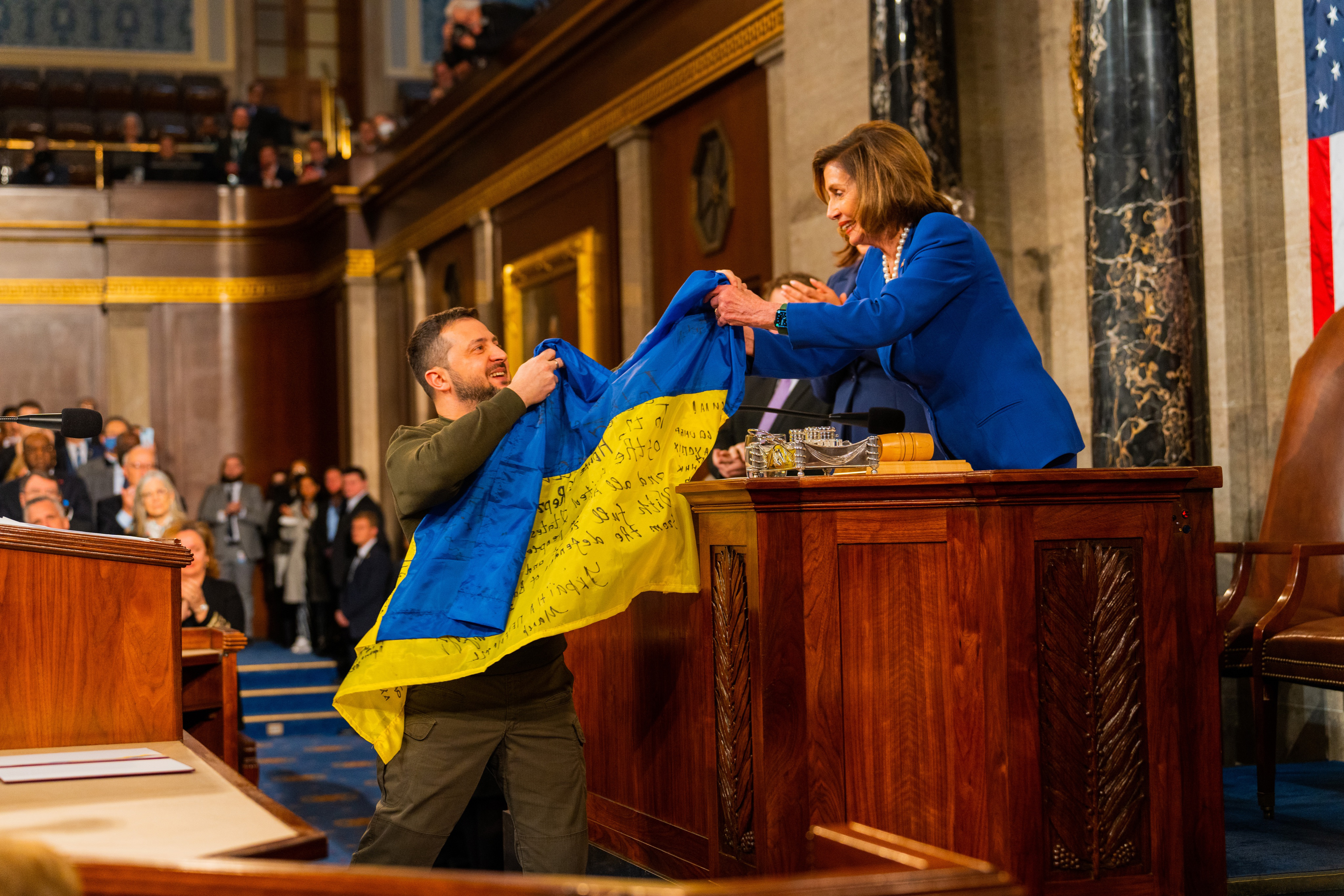
Nancy Pelosi receiving a Ukrainian flag from the Battle of Bakhmut at the end of his speech

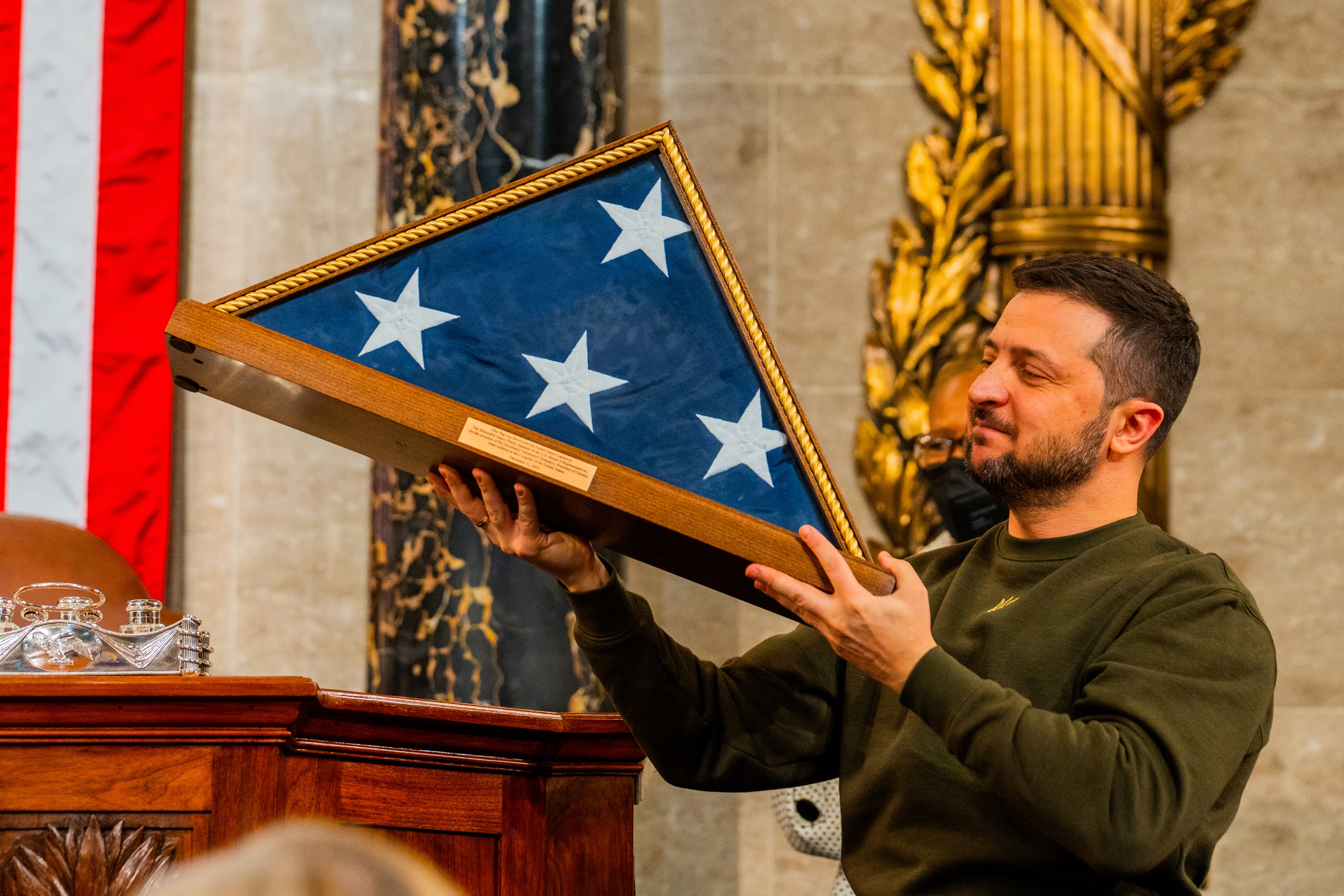
Zelenskyy receiving a United States flag from Nancy Pelosi and Vice President Kamala Harris

== See also ==
- List of joint sessions of the United States Congress § 2020s
- List of international presidential trips made by Volodymyr Zelenskyy
  - May 2023 European visits by Volodymyr Zelenskyy
  - 2023 visit by Volodymyr Zelenskyy to the United Kingdom
- 2023 visit by Joe Biden to Ukraine
