= 2023 visit by Volodymyr Zelenskyy to the United Kingdom =

Meeting of leaders of Ukraine and the United Kingdom

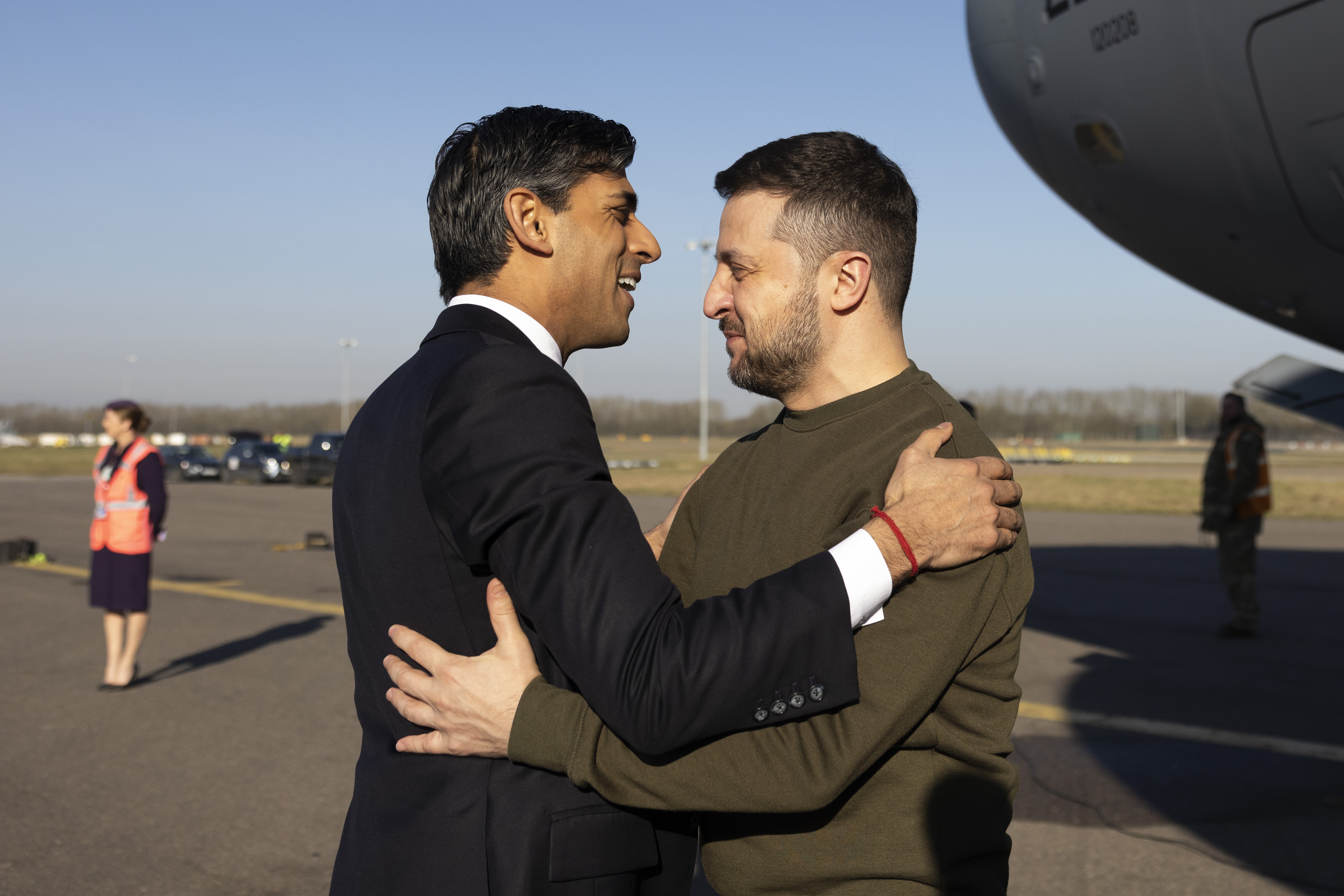
- President Zelenskyy and Prime Minister Sunak meeting at London Stansted Airport
- Date: 8 February 2023
- Location: London, United Kingdom

On 8 February 2023, Volodymyr Zelenskyy, the president of Ukraine, visited the United Kingdom. During his trip, Zelenskyy met Rishi Sunak, the Prime Minister of the United Kingdom at the time. He also addressed members of parliament from Westminster Hall in the Houses of Parliament and had an audience with King Charles III. It was Zelenskyy's second trip outside Ukraine since the beginning of the Russian invasion of Ukraine, after his December 2022 visit to the United States.

== Background ==
On 24 February 2022, Russia invaded Ukraine in a major escalation of the Russo-Ukrainian War that began in 2014. Throughout the war, a number of states have provided military and humanitarian aid to Ukraine, including the United Kingdom; in 2022, the UK government spent £2.3 billion on military aid for Ukraine.

== Visit to the United Kingdom ==
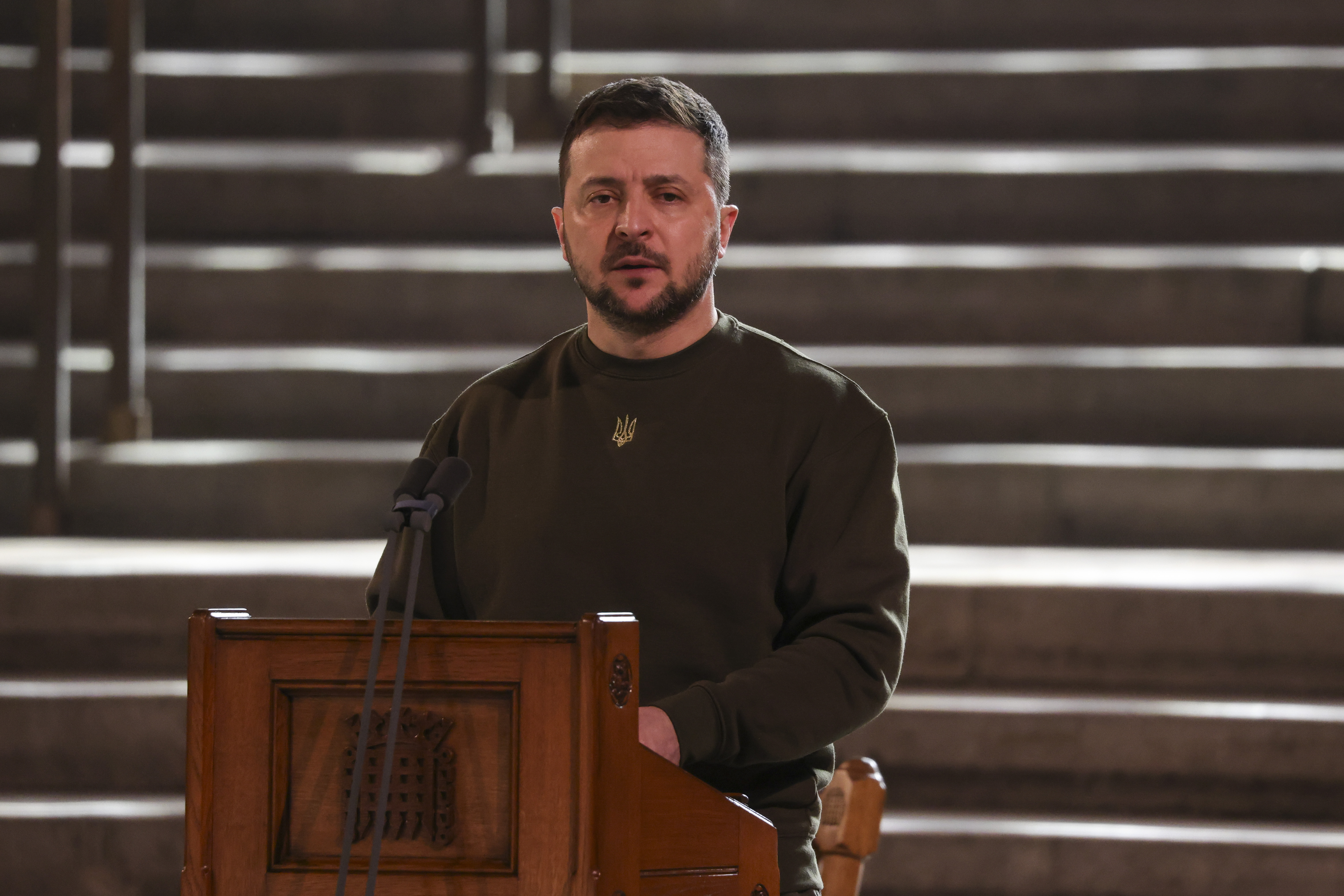
Zelenskyy addressing members of parliament from Westminster Hall in the Houses of Parliament

Zelenskyy flew from Rzeszów–Jasionka Airport in Poland to London Stansted Airport aboard an RAF C-17 (serial number ZZ178). He was greeted on the tarmac at Stansted by the prime minister of the United Kingdom, Rishi Sunak, who invited Zelenskyy to 10 Downing Street. Zelenskyy later addressed members of parliament from Westminster Hall in the Houses of Parliament, where he received a standing ovation.

Zelenskyy had an audience with King Charles III, before visiting Ukrainian troops being trained at Lulworth Camp in Dorset.

== Gallery ==
President Zelenskyy during 2023 trip to the UK

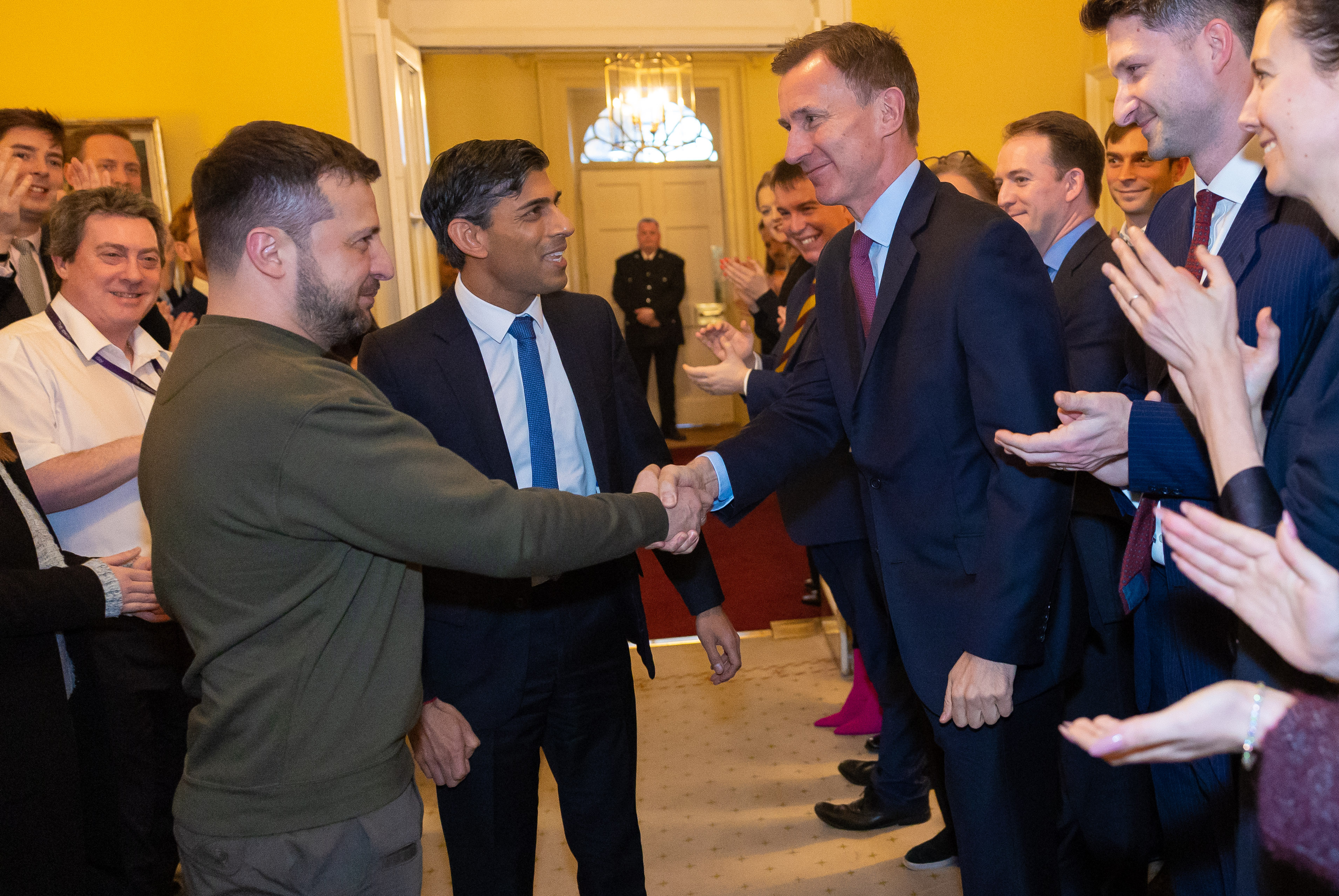

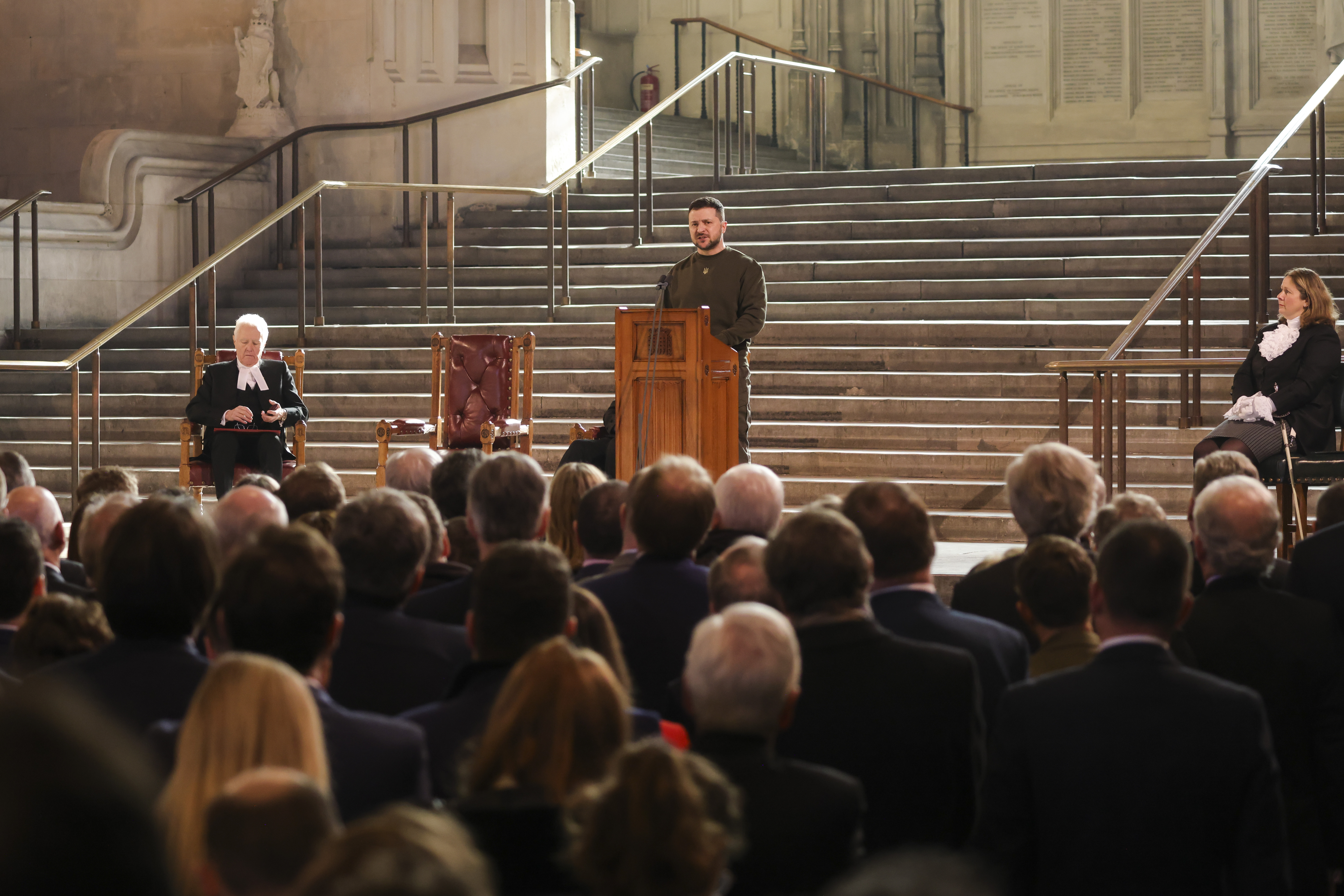

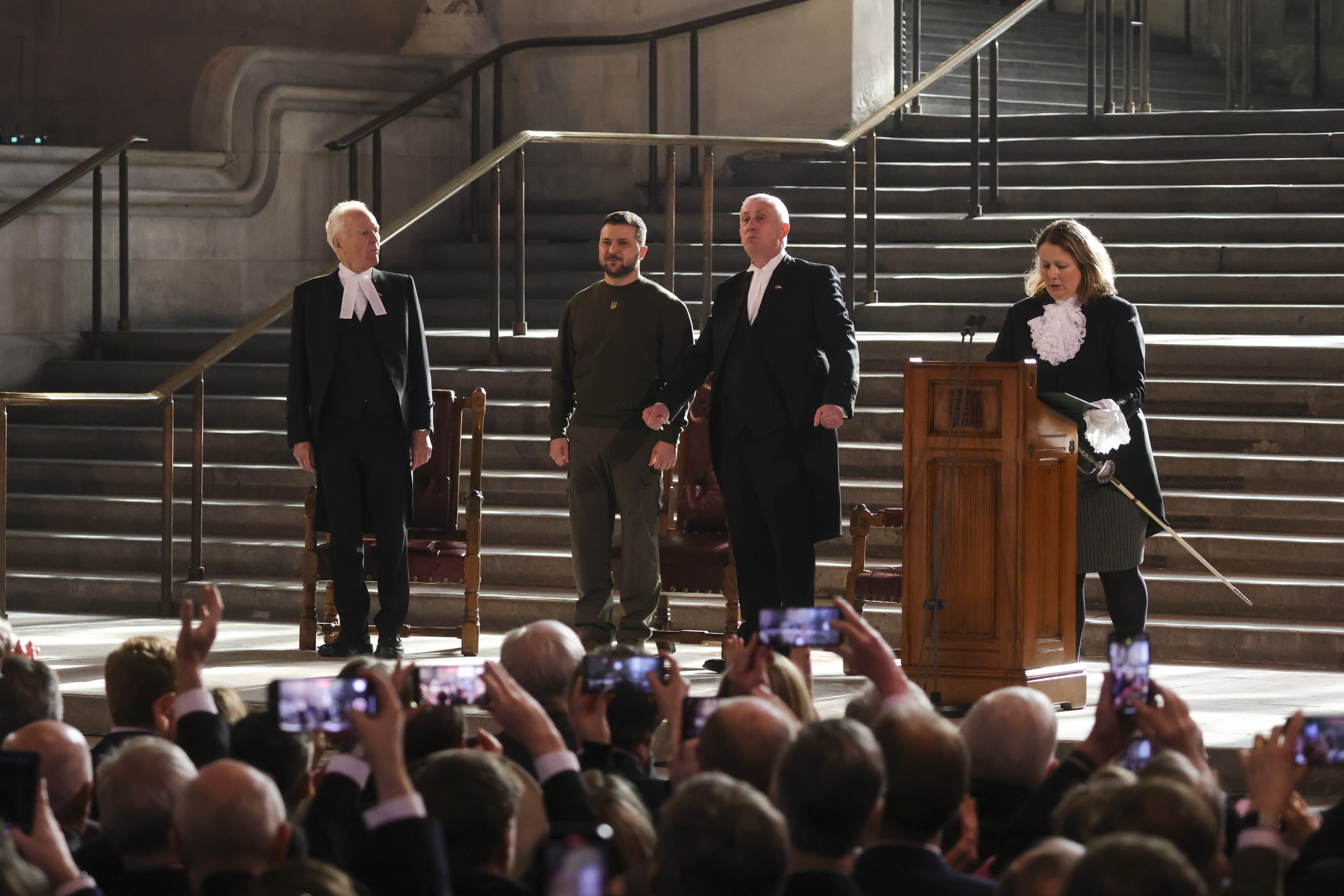

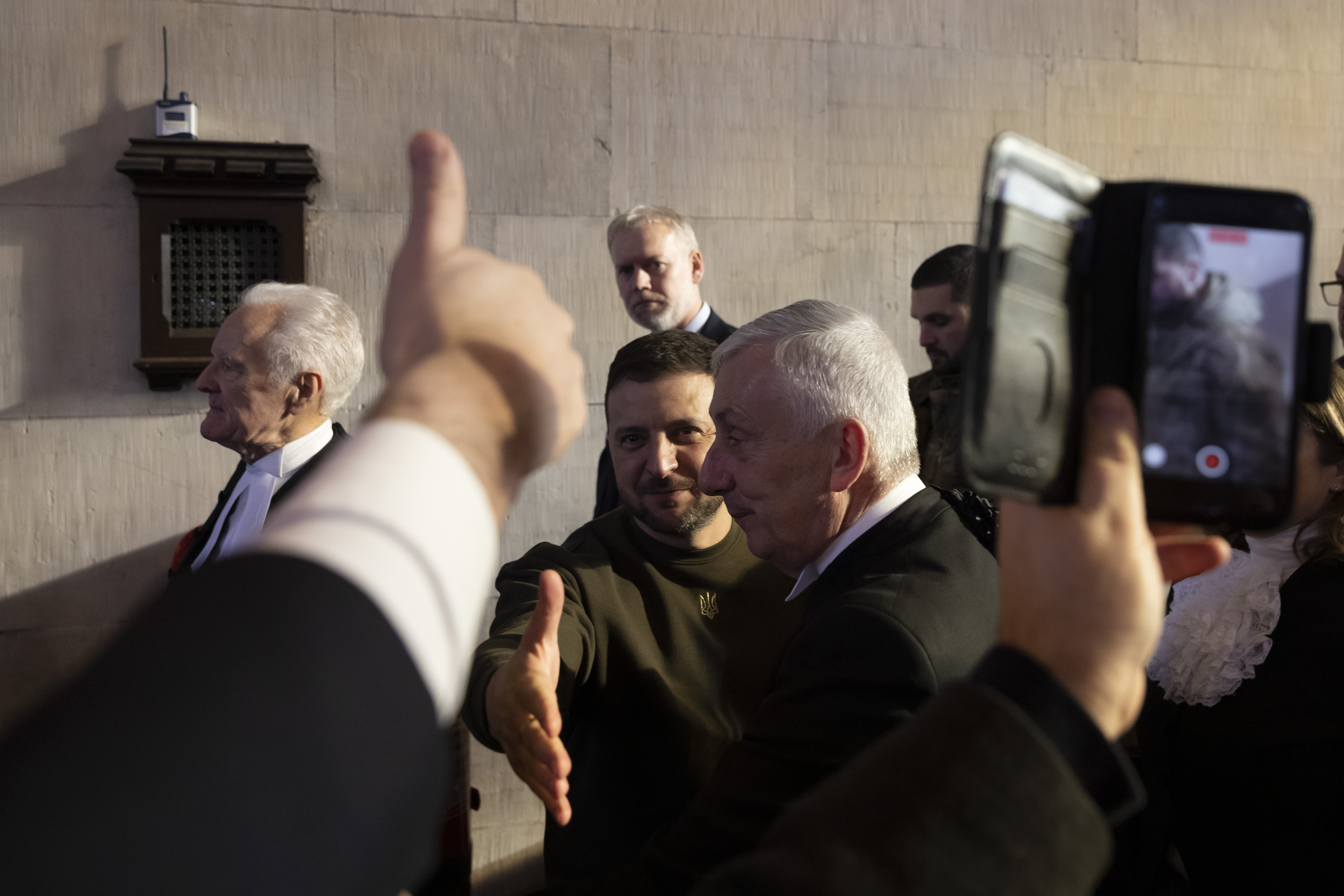

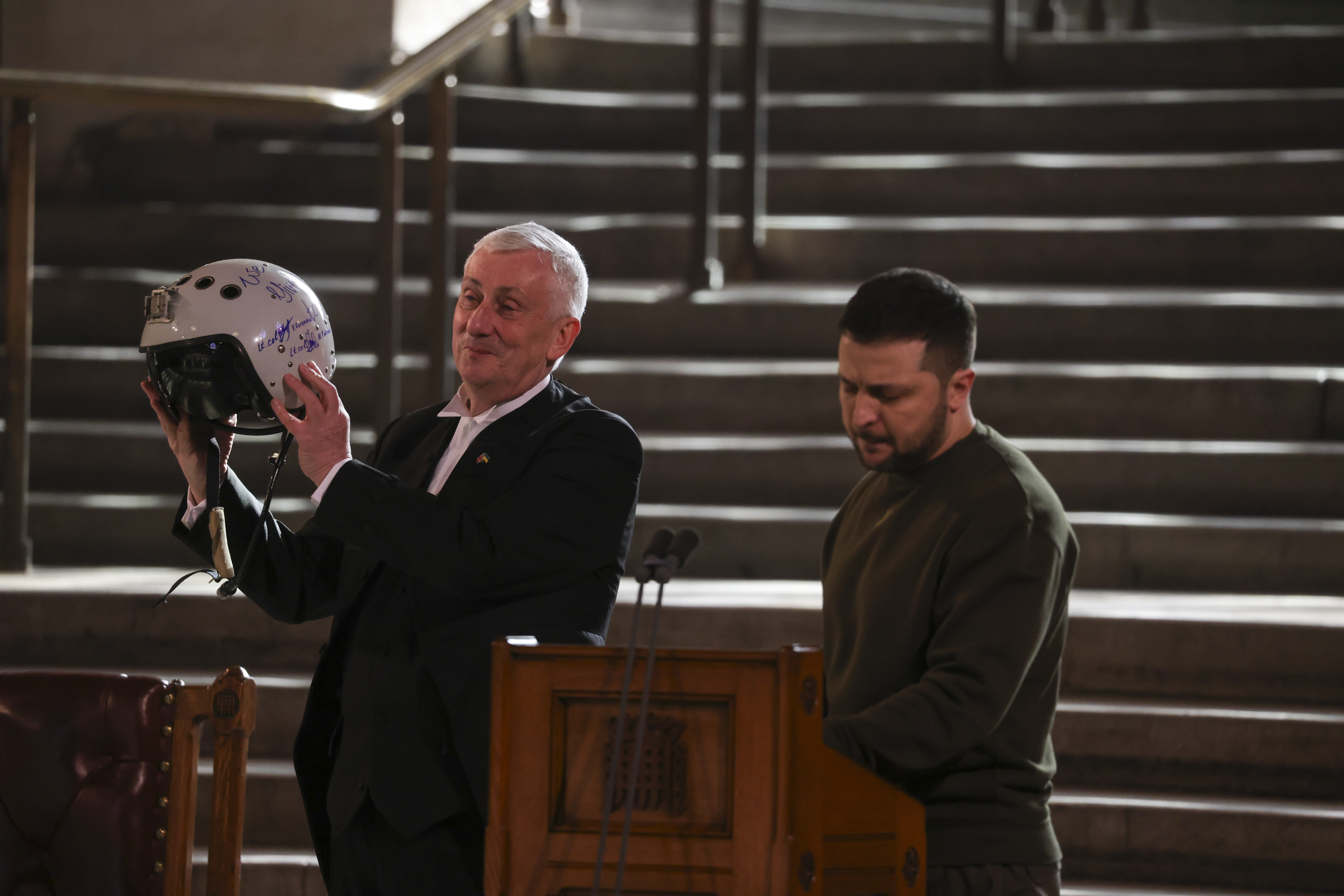

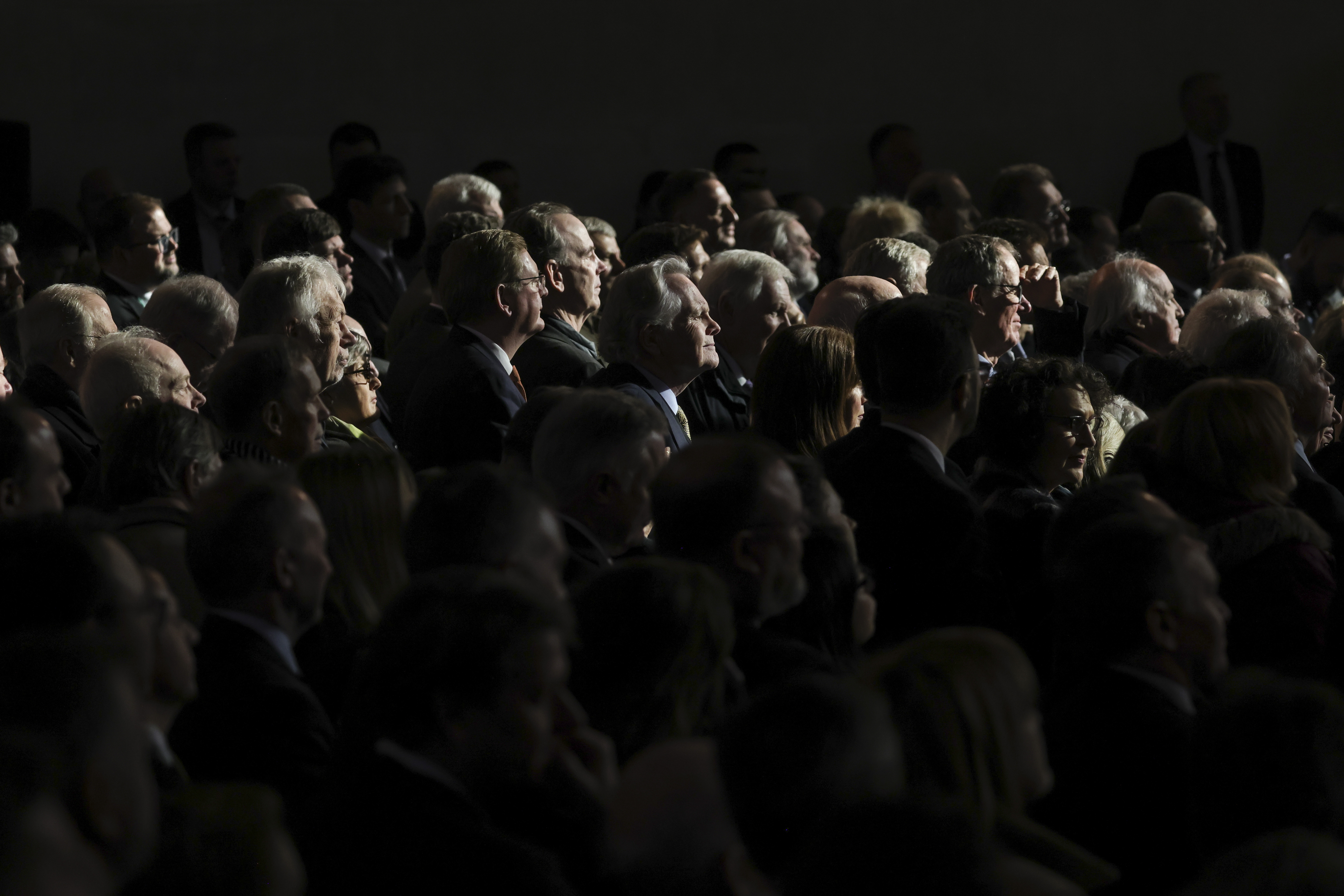

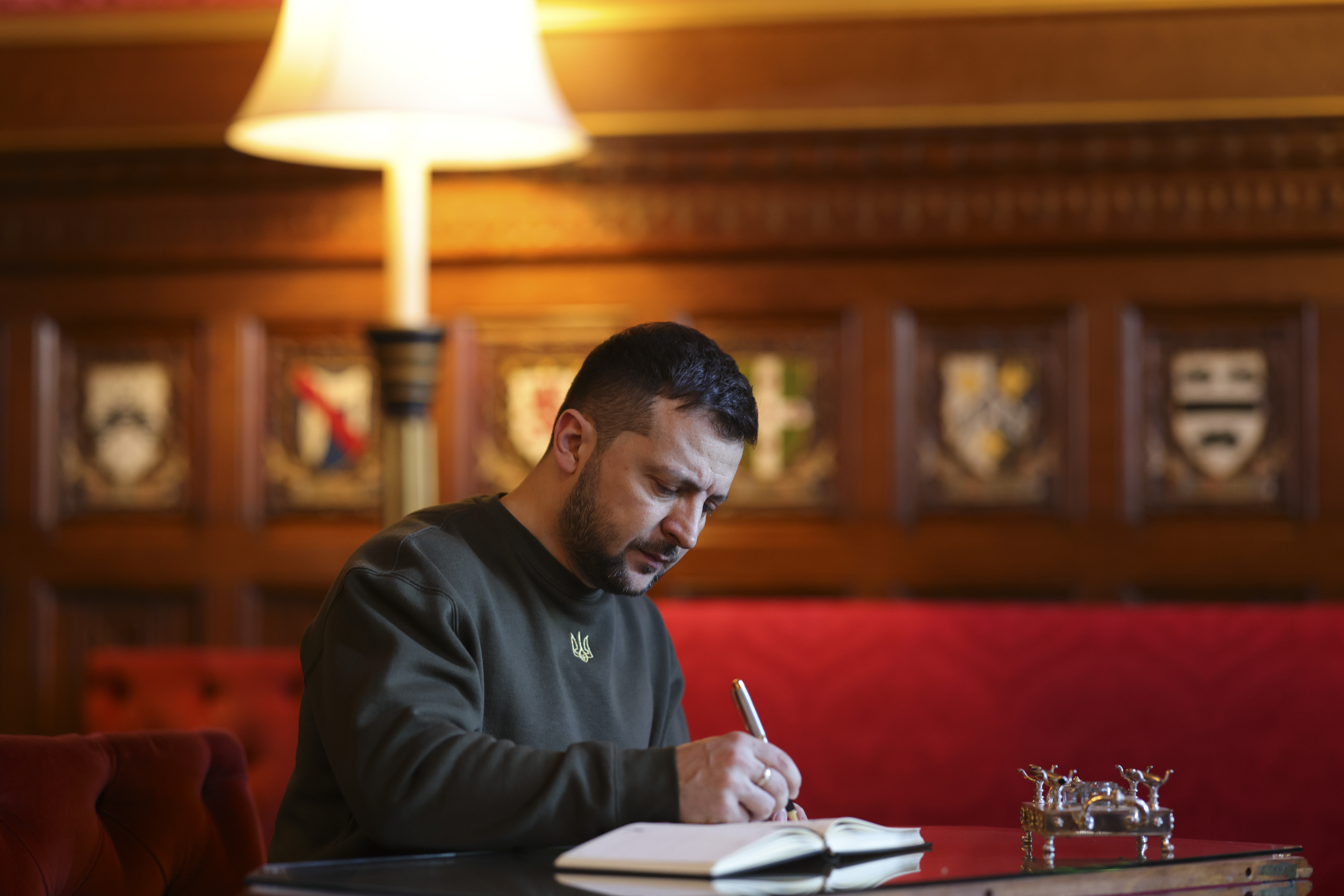

== See also ==
- List of international presidential trips made by Volodymyr Zelenskyy
  - 2022 visit by Volodymyr Zelenskyy to the United States
  - May 2023 European visits by Volodymyr Zelenskyy
- 2023 visit by Joe Biden to Ukraine
