= 2023 visit by Joe Biden to Ukraine =

U.S. presidential state visit

- Part of the Russo-Ukrainian war (2022–present)
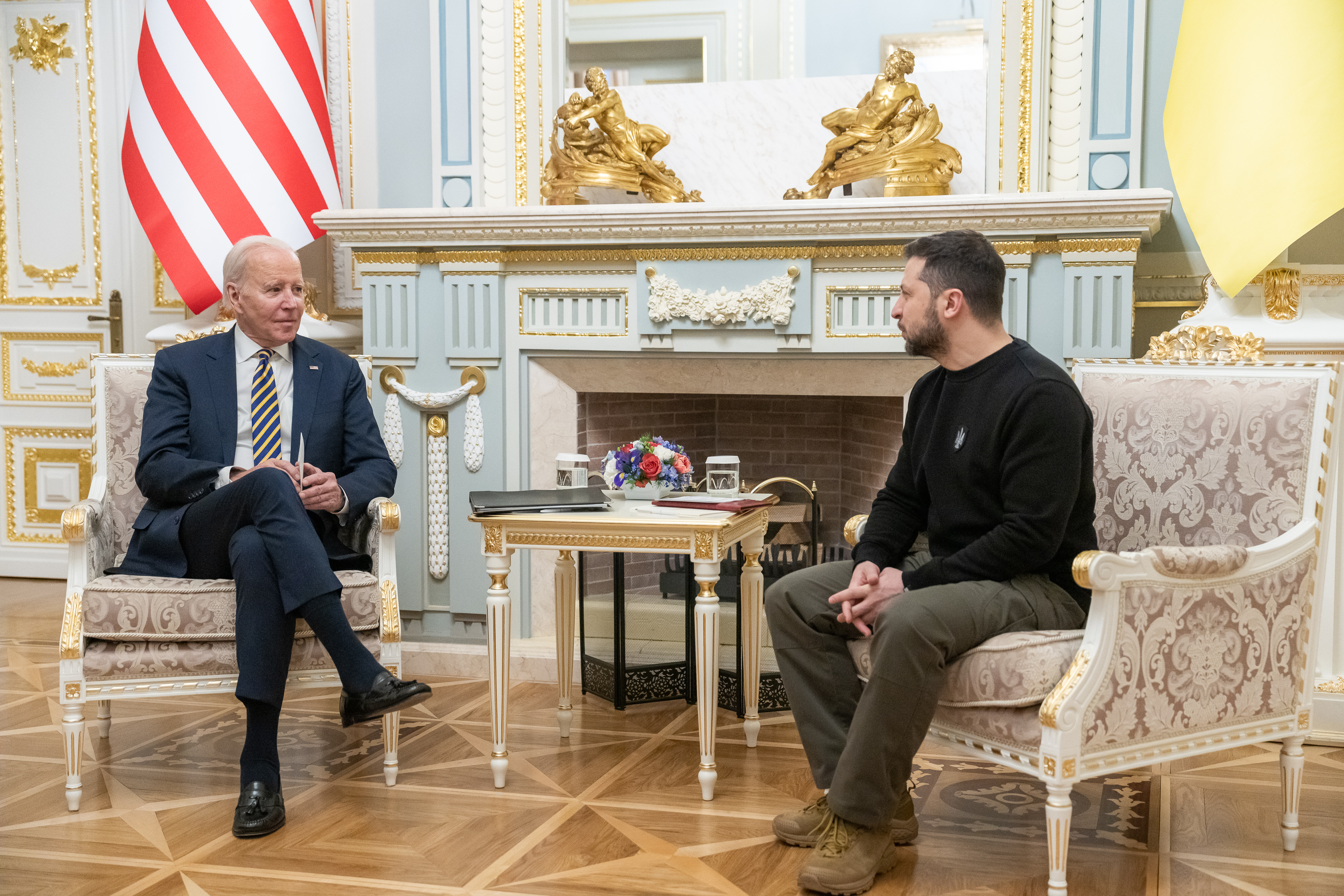
- President Biden and President Zelenskyy, February 20, 2023
- Date: February 20, 2023
- Location: Kyiv, Ukraine

On February 20, 2023, the president of the United States, Joe Biden, made a visit to Kyiv, the capital of Ukraine, following the beginning of the Russian invasion of Ukraine. Out of security concerns, his travel plans had not been made public prior to his arrival, and only two journalists accompanied him, having been sworn to secrecy three days earlier.

The visit took place on the day Ukraine observes the Heavenly Hundred, on the eve of a scheduled major speech by Russian president Vladimir Putin and four days ahead of the 1-year anniversary of the full-scale invasion. The trip lasted a total of 24 hours, the majority of which were taken by the long train rides. During the five hours of meetings in Kyiv, Biden announced another $500 million in military assistance to Ukraine.

Biden's visit received a mixed reaction in the United States, split primarily along political party lines. It was the first time in modern history that a sitting U.S. president has traveled to an active conflict zone not controlled by the American military, and was the closest a president had come to a combat zone since Abraham Lincoln during the American Civil War. It was also the first presidential visit by an American president since 2008. The Pentagon and the Secret Service opposed the visit to Kyiv.

== Background ==
On February 24, 2022, Russia began a full-scale invasion of Ukraine. Throughout the war, the United States had been the largest supporter of Ukraine, committing over US$27 billion in security assistance since the invasion began.

The Pentagon and the Secret Service opposed Biden visiting Kyiv, and there were rumors about a possible meeting near the Polish border or in Lviv, Western Ukraine. The visit also came during softening support for the U.S. supplying weapons to Ukraine, according to polls.

== Visit to Ukraine ==
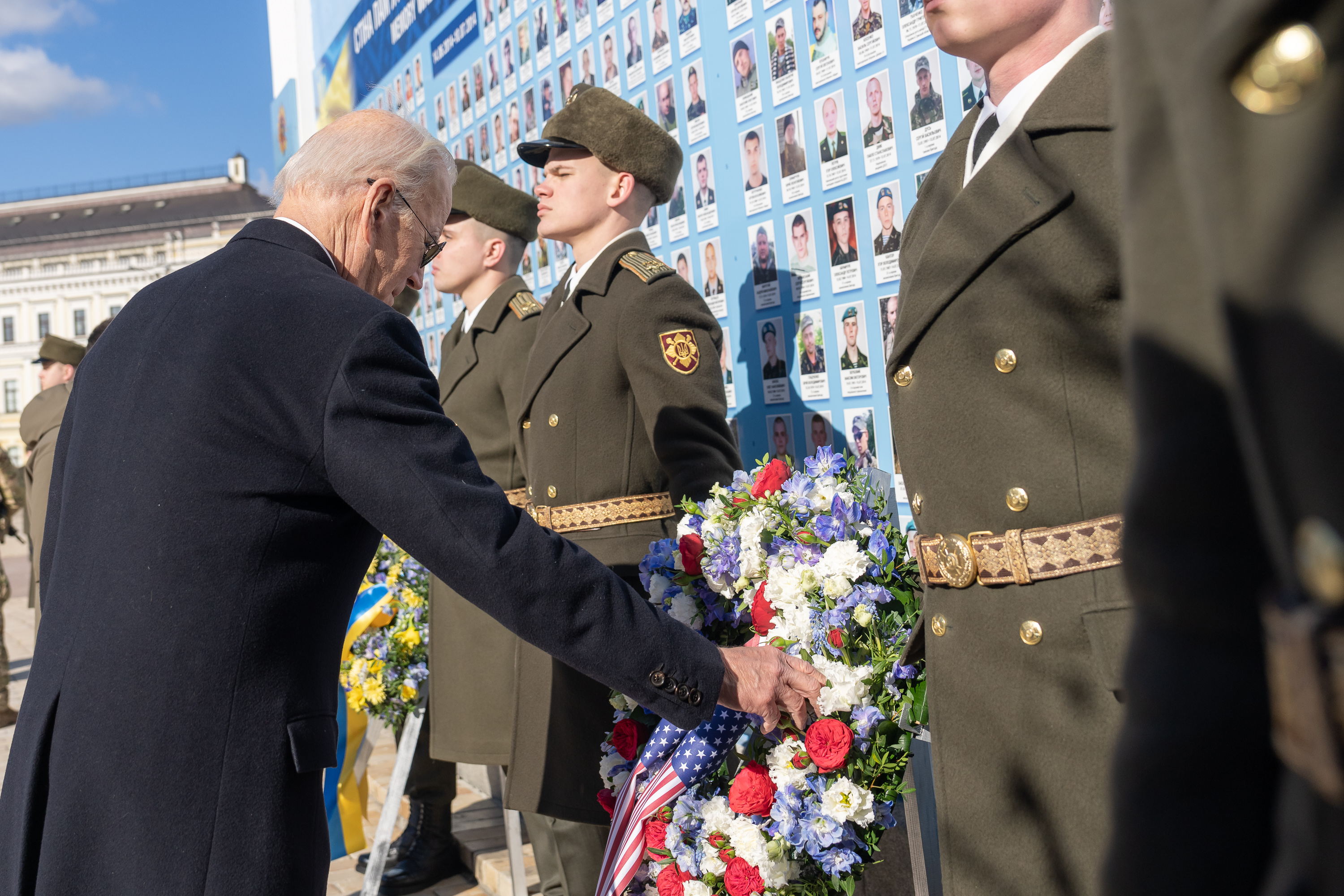
Joe Biden visits the Wall of Remembrance of the Fallen for Ukraine.

External videos
- President Biden Visits Ukraine, February 20, 2023, C-SPAN

Amid great secrecy, at about 4am EST on February 19, 2023, Biden departed the White House and travelled to Joint Base Andrews for a flight to the local airport at Rzeszów, Poland, with a refueling stop at Ramstein Air Base in Germany, on a Boeing C-32A with the call sign "SAM060". Upon arrival at Rzeszów and transfer by car to Przemyśl, Biden boarded an overnight train to Kyiv, the method by which many world leaders visited the capital since the beginning of the invasion. This particular train was dubbed "Rail Force One". The Russian government was informed prior to Biden's visit, but an identical ghost train was run simultaneously to the train carrying Biden on a different route to counter-intelligence. The train ride lasted nearly 10 hours. During Biden's five hours in Kyiv, he was transported in a black limousine rather than the usual armored presidential car.

During his visit, Biden met with Volodymyr Zelenskyy, the president of Ukraine, and Olena Zelenska, the first lady of Ukraine. The White House stated the visit to an active warzone was unprecedented as the U.S. does not have a military presence in Ukraine, nor a significant diplomatic footprint in Kyiv. The visit was the first in modern history that a US leader has traveled into a war zone not under control of the US military.

Air-raid sirens blared in Kyiv while Biden and Zelenskyy were walking outside. The sirens were triggered by a Russian MiG, carrying a hypersonic missile, taking off in Belarus. There were no attacks on Kyiv during the visit.

The trip preceded a scheduled visit to Europe, but the White House released a schedule about four hours after Biden entered Ukraine indicating he was still in Washington and was leaving for Europe that night. The visit took place on the day Ukraine remembers the Heavenly Hundred, on the eve of a scheduled major speech by Russian president Vladimir Putin and four days ahead of the 1-year anniversary of the full-scale invasion by Russia. The US government believes that while Biden was in Ukraine, Russia conducted a test of an RS-28 Sarmat ICBM that failed. Russia gave the US advance notice of the test.

Biden's trip in Ukraine lasted a total of 24 hours, the majority of which were taken by the long train rides. Oleksandr Kamyshin, the CEO of Ukrainian Railways, said the company named the train "Rail Force One" and apologized for the delays caused to other passengers. After the visit, Biden returned to Poland where he had a meeting with the Bucharest Nine and delivered a speech in Warsaw. He also condemned Russia's backing away from the New START nuclear arms reduction treaty.

=== Joint press conference with Zelenskyy ===
Biden held a joint press conference with Zelenskyy at Mariinskyi Palace, remarking that "One year later, Kyiv stands. And Ukraine stands. Democracy stands. The Americans stand with you, and the world stands with you."

=== Military aid announcement ===
Biden announced an additional military aid package of US$500 million for Ukraine, including ammunition for the HIMARS rocket launcher system.

== Reactions ==
=== Domestic reactions ===
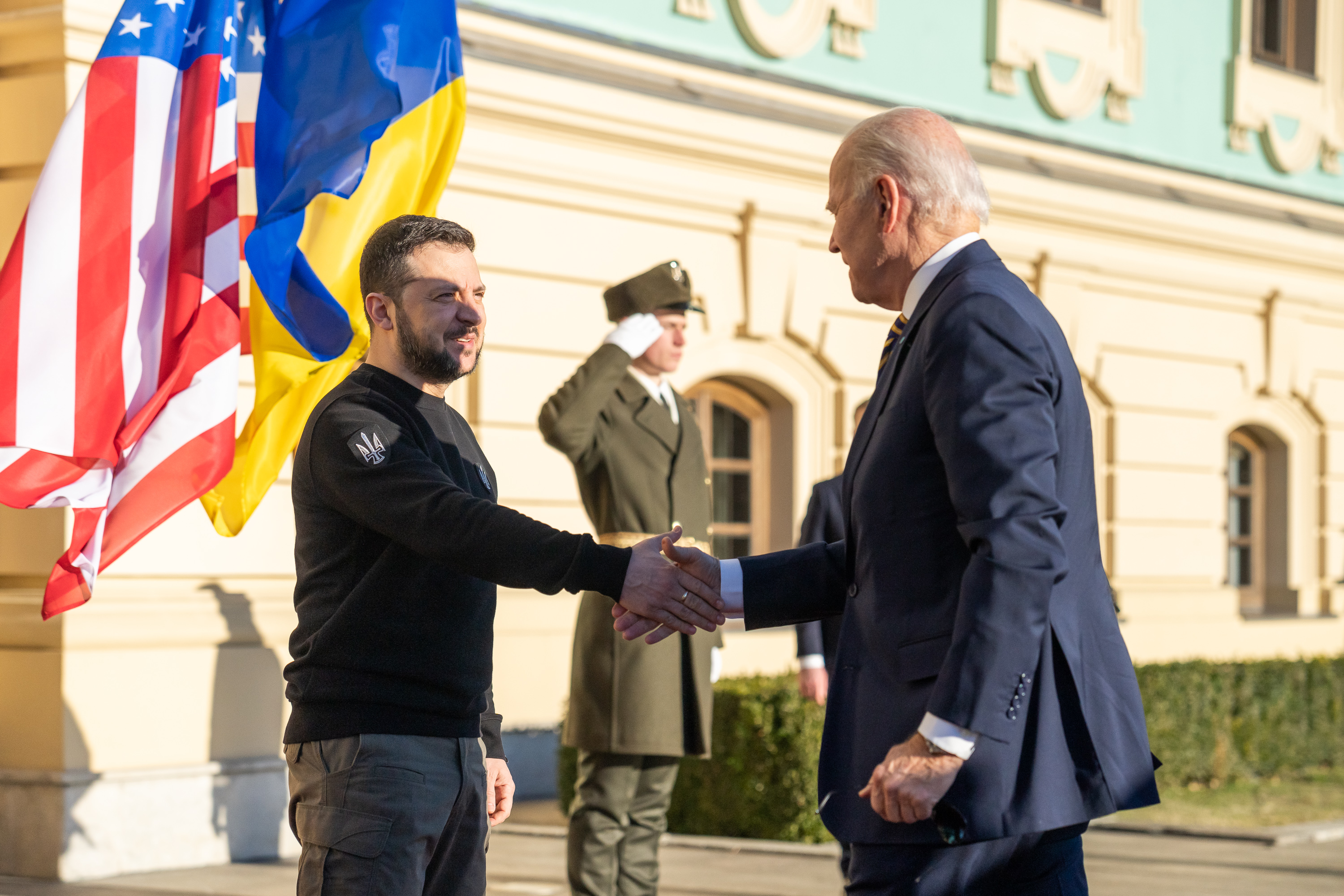
Zelenskyy receives Biden in Kyiv.

==== Media ====
Luke Harding from The Guardian called the visit "arguably the most consequential made by any US president to a European country since the end of the Cold War." Anne Applebaum wrote in The Atlantic that the visit was a message not only to Moscow, but also to European leaders as well as defense ministries and industries: "the paradigm has shifted, and the story has changed. The old "normal" is not coming back."

==== Politicians ====
Political scientist Eliot A. Cohen compared the symbolism of the trip to President John F. Kennedy or President Ronald Reagan at the Berlin Wall, and saw it as a gut punch to Putin, a leader "obsessed with strength". Republicans criticized Biden's travel to a war zone that does not have a considerable American military presence, saying that Biden would have been better off going to the Mexican border or East Palestine, Ohio, that was recently affected by toxic waste released by a crashed train. Biden previously visited the US–Mexico border wall in El Paso on January 8, 2023.

United States Republican Congressmen Andy Ogles, Marjorie Taylor Greene, and Matt Gaetz published statements on Twitter decrying the trip, while virtually all Democrats and many Republicans, including Lindsey Graham and Mitt Romney, praised Biden's leadership and support of Ukraine. National Security Advisor Jake Sullivan said, "the visit today was an effort to show, and not just tell, that we will continue to stand strong." White House officials described the visit as "unprecedented in modern times", due to the regular attacks that the site of the visit was under.

Ukrainian residents and officials welcomed the visit as a historic moment and Zelenskyy said it "is an extremely important sign of support for all Ukrainians." Andriy Yermak, the Head of the Office of the President of Ukraine, said the visit also had strategic effect: "A lot of issues are being resolved and those that have been pending will be expedited".

=== International reactions ===
Former Russian president Dmitry Medvedev dismissed the visit as an effort to increase the "huge quantities" of weapons and money already sent to Ukraine. Many of Russia's military pundits reacted with anger or embarrassment.

Igor Girkin suggested "the grandfather" could have gone to the heavily contested Bakhmut area without any personal danger.

Journalist Sergey Mardan wrote that it was a "demonstrative humiliation of Russia." A collective of service members noted the irony of Biden setting foot in Kyiv before Putin.

Analysts as well as Polish president Andrzej Duda saw the trip as an important morale boost for the Ukrainian soldiers. After news of the visit broke, Japanese prime minister Fumio Kishida announced $5.5 billion in new financial and humanitarian aid to Ukraine.

== Gallery ==
President Biden during his 2023 trip to Ukraine

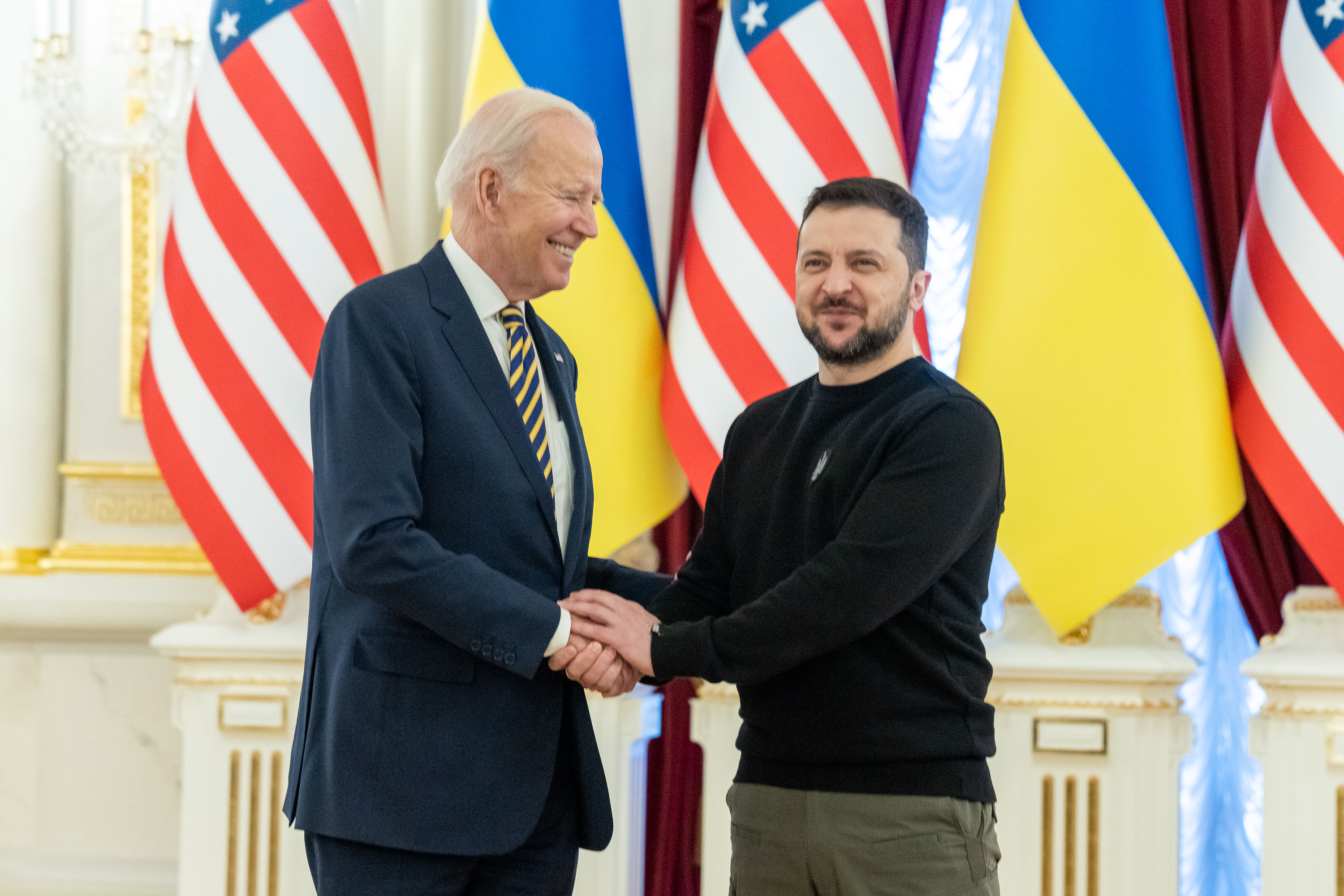
Biden meets with Zelenskyy in 2023.

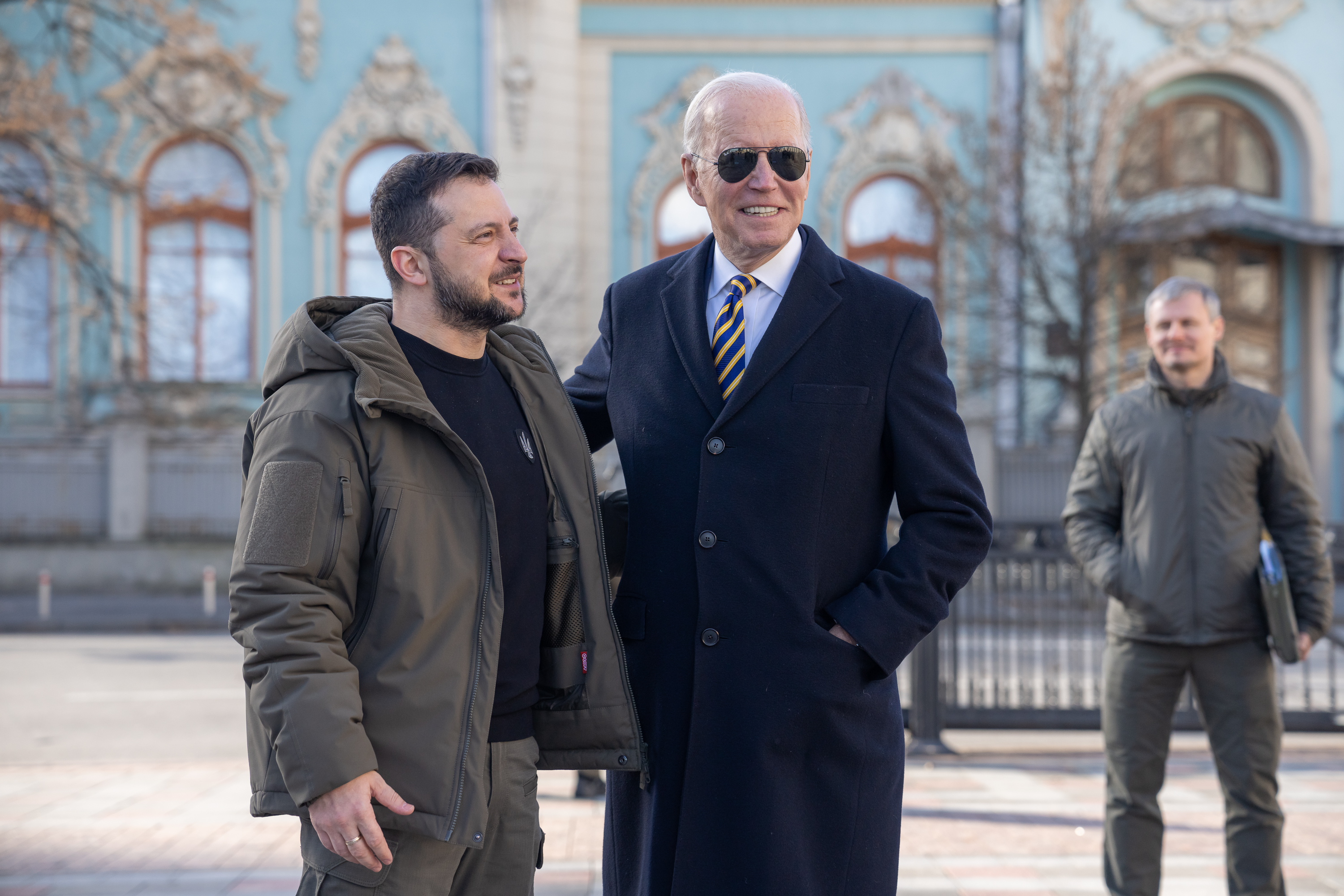
Biden and Zelenskyy outside Mariinskyi Palace, Kyiv

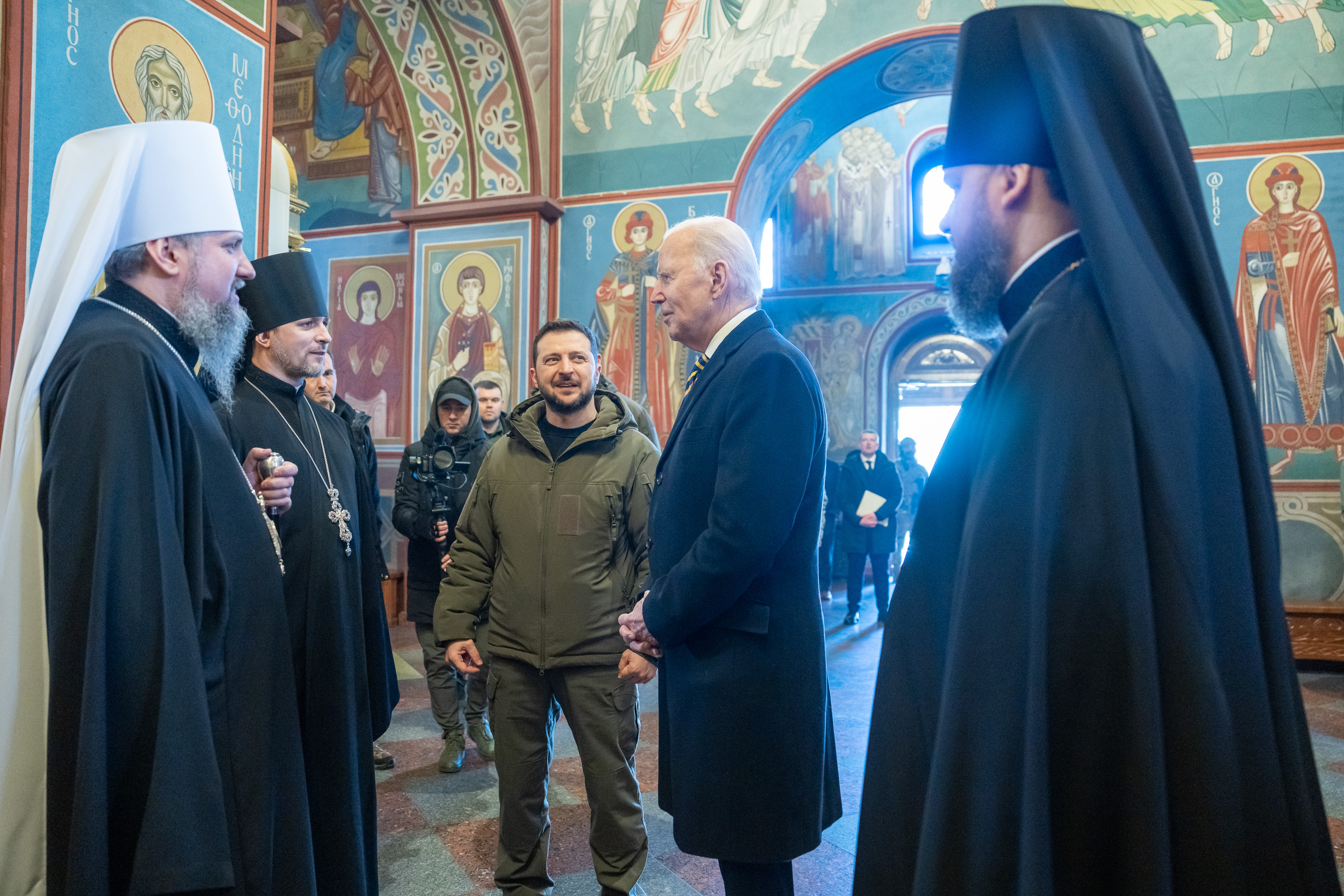
Biden, Zelenskyy and Metropolitan Epiphanius

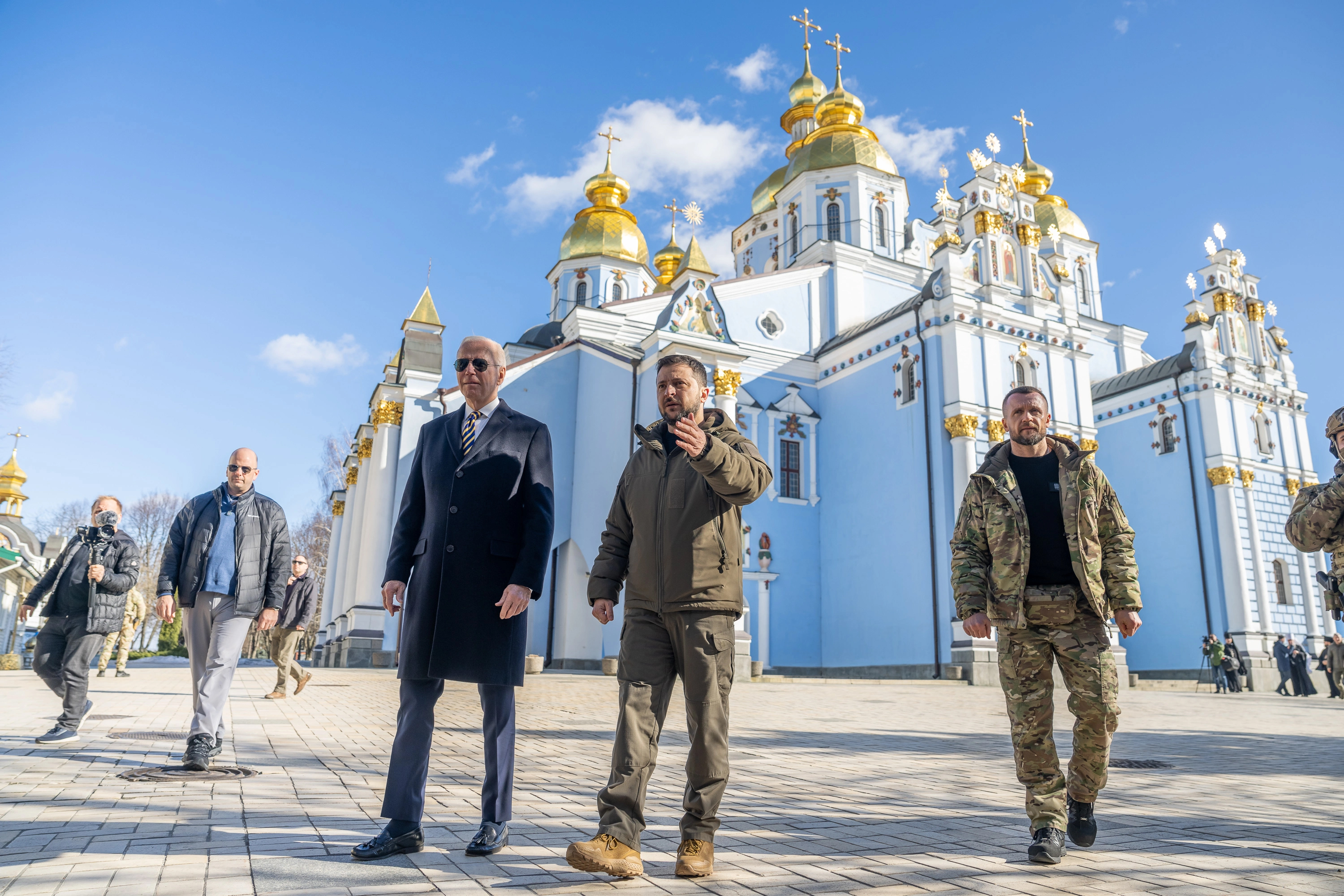
Biden and Zelenskyy outside St. Michael's Cathedral, Kyiv

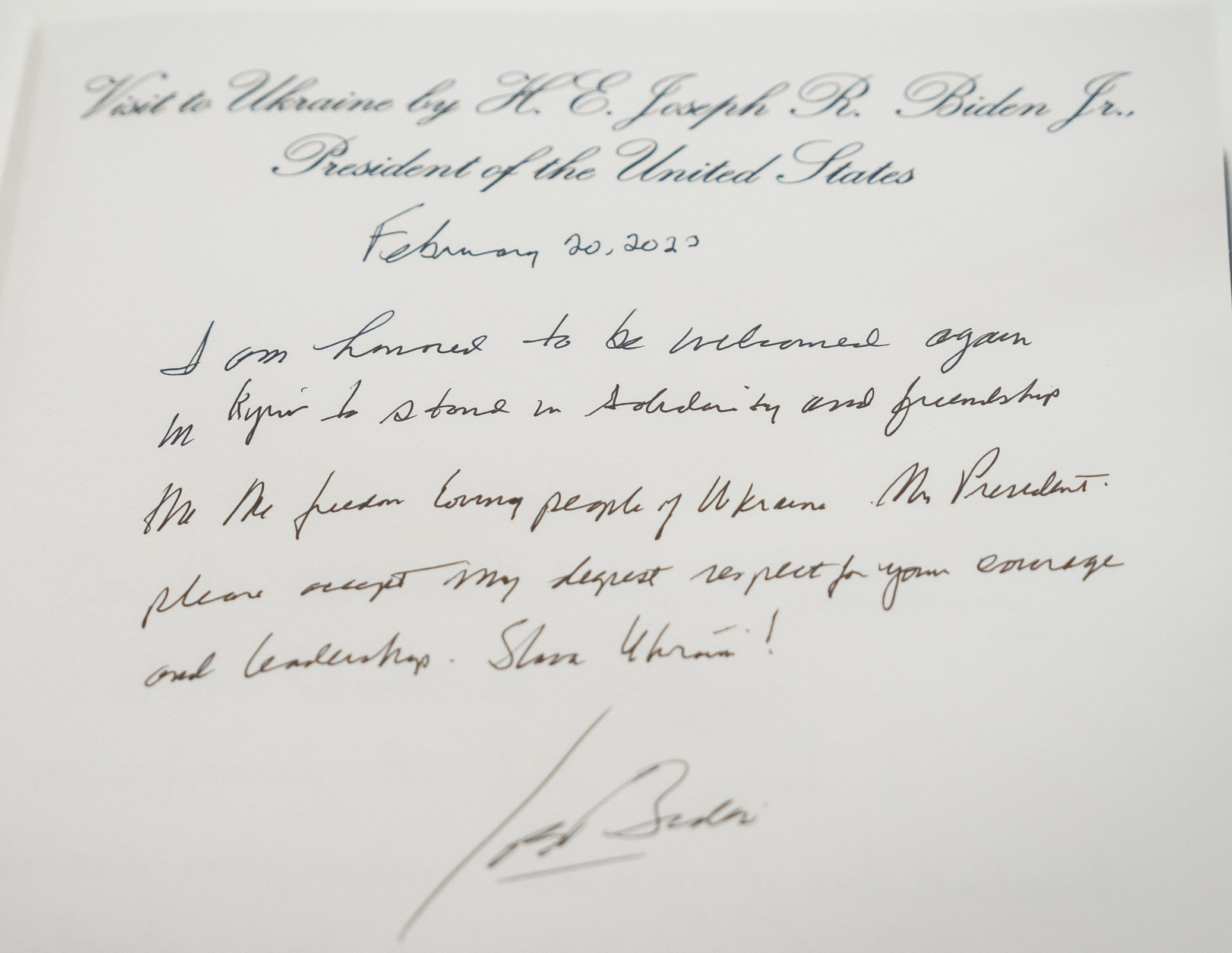
Biden's message ending in "Slava Ukraini!"

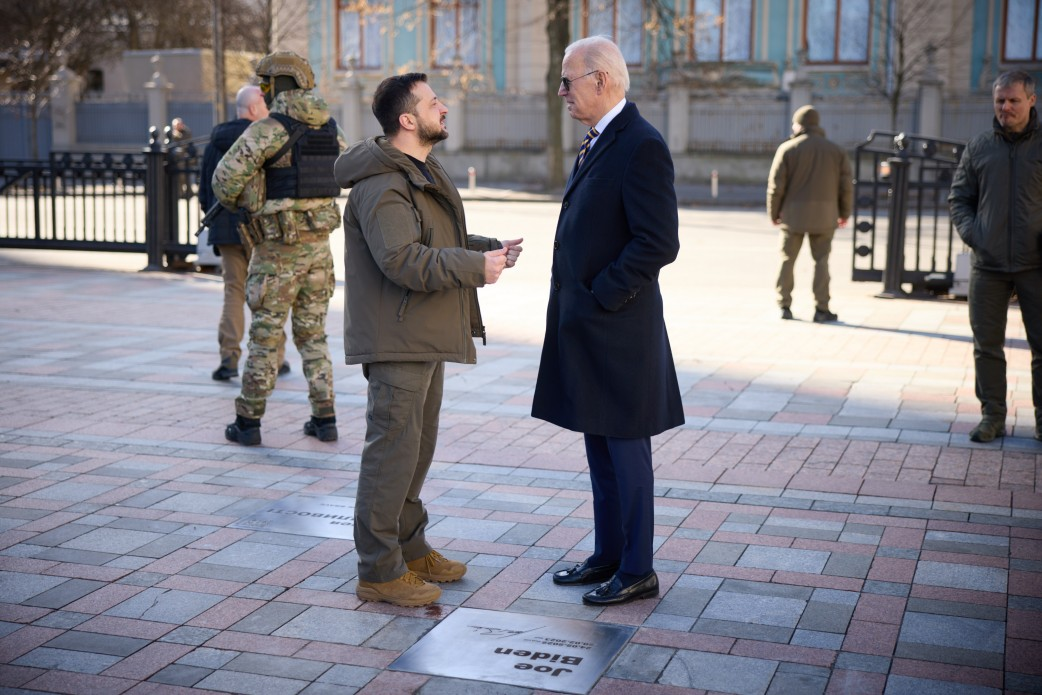
Biden and Zelenskyy unveiled a plaque dedicated to the U.S. President on the Walk of the Brave

== See also ==
- 2022 Joe Biden speech in Warsaw – Speech on the Russian invasion of Ukraine
- 2022 visit by Volodymyr Zelenskyy to the United States – Bilateral meeting between the leaders of Ukraine and the United States
- 2023 visit by Volodymyr Zelenskyy to the United Kingdom – Meeting of leaders of Ukraine and the United Kingdom
- 2023 visit by Xi Jinping to Russia – 2023 meeting between China and Russia's leaders
- Iron diplomacy – Transport of world leaders in Ukraine by rail
- List of international presidential trips made by Joe Biden
- List of serving heads of state and government that have visited Ukraine during the Russian invasion of Ukraine
- United States and the Russian invasion of Ukraine
