= Kurai =

Kurai may refer to:

== Place ==
- Band Kurai, a town in Dera Ismail Khan, Khyber Pakhtunkhwa, Pakistan
- Mount Kurai is a mountain located on the border of the cities of Takayama and Gero in Gifu Prefecture
- Kurai, Seoni Kurai is a village and tehsil in Seoni District of Madhya Pradesh, India
- Kurai, Khyber Pakhtunkhwa, a town in Dera Ismail Khan, Khyber Pakhtunkhwa, Pakistan
- Kurai Taji railway station, a railway station located at Balai Kurai Taji, South Pariaman, Pariaman
- Kuray Mountains, a mountain range in Russia's Altai Republic

== People ==
- Ulamila Kurai Wragg, (born 1968) Fijian journalist
- Shuichi Thomas Kurai, (1947–2018) Japanese-born Soto Zen roshi and head abbot of Sozenji Buddhist Temple
- Kurai Musanhi (born 2006), Zimbabwean footballer
- Kurai Takashi, (倉井高志; 1955) Japanese diplomat. He was ambassador of Japan to Ukraine from 2019 to 2021

== Other uses ==
- Kurai (flute), a long open endblown flute
- Kurai Onrum Illai, a Tamil devotional song written by C. Rajagopalachari
