= 2023 visit by Fumio Kishida to Ukraine =

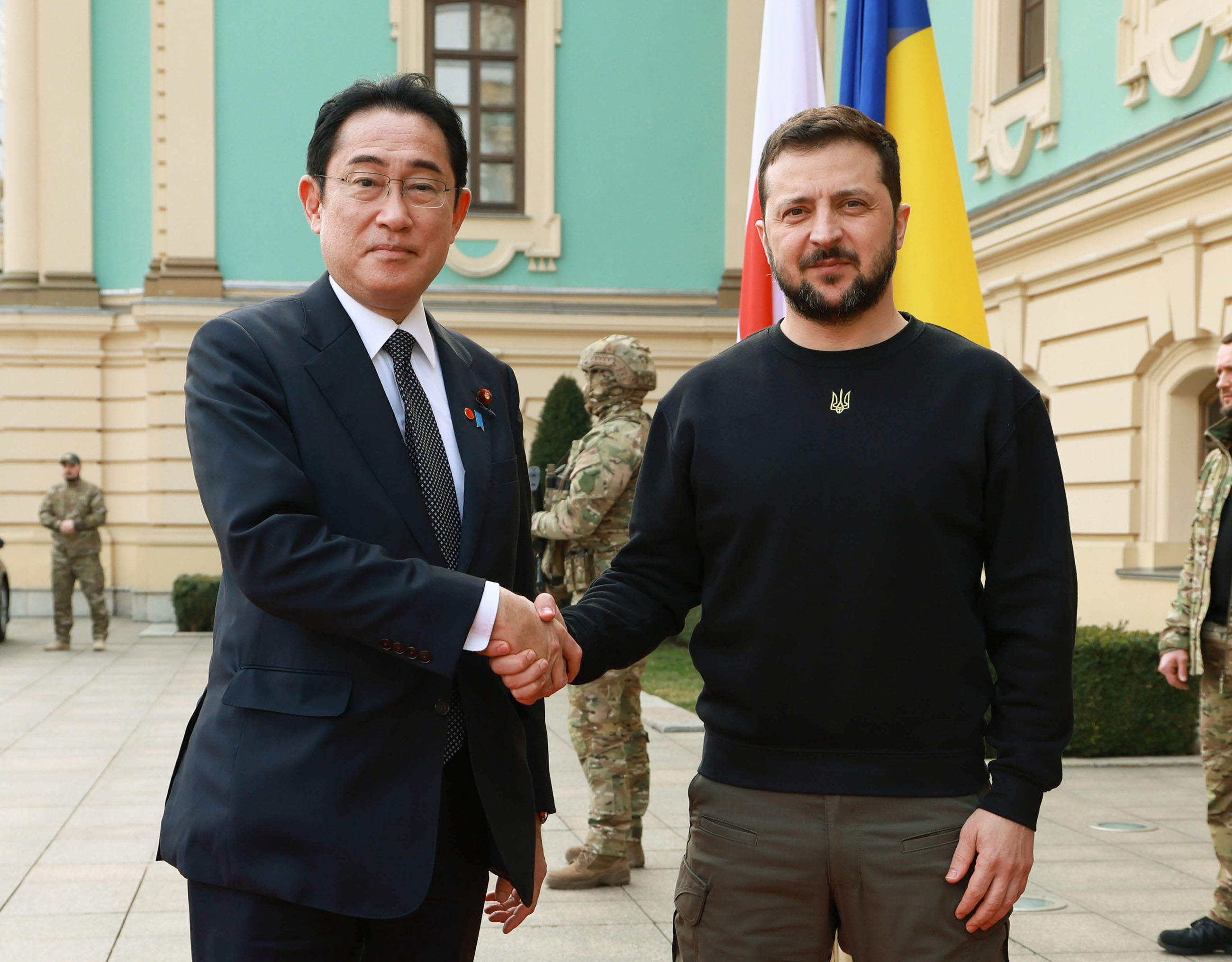
- Prime Minister Kishida receiving greetings from President Zelenskyy.
- Date: 21 March 2023
- Location: Kyiv and Bucha, Ukraine
- Type: Diplomatic visit
- Participants: Fumio Kishida; Volodymyr Zelenskyy
- Outcome: Non-lethal defense equipment assistance amounting to US$30 million.; Assistance including new bilateral grant aid amounting to US$470 million in the energy sector.; It was decided that President Zelenskyy to participate online to 49th G7 summit.; Agreed to upgrade the bilateral relations to the Special Global Partnership.; Agreed to start coordination for the conclusion of Japan–Ukraine Agreement on the Security of Information.

On 21 March 2023, Fumio Kishida, the Prime Minister of Japan, visited Ukraine. This was the first visit to Ukraine by the Prime Minister since the beginning of the Russian invasion of Ukraine.

Out of security concerns, plans for the visit had not been made public prior, and only about ten persons, including his entourages, accompanied him, from India, the first destination on the itinerary.

Kishida became the first Prime Minister of Japan to visit a battlefield since the end of World War II.

== Background ==
Kishida had been planning to visit Kyiv, the capital of Ukraine, since the beginning of the Russian invasion of Ukraine. Japan was to act as the host state for the 49th G7 summit to be held in May 2023, with the situation in Ukraine on the main agenda, so, Kishida thought it was essential to visit Ukraine and talk directly with Volodymyr Zelenskyy, the President of Ukraine. However, due to problems such as ensuring safety of Kishida at the actual place and the convention of advance report to the National Diet, (Note: It is customary for the Prime Minister and ministers to report to the board of Committee on Rules and Administration in advance when they make diplomatic visits, during the session of the National Diet.) it had not been realized.

In June 2022, it was reported that the leaders of France, Germany and Italy (Note: Emmanuel Macron (President of France), Olaf Scholz (Chancellor of Germany) and Mario Draghi (Prime Minister of Italy).) were planning a joint visit to Ukraine before the 48th G7 summit. Since Kishida was scheduled to visit Europe to participate in the summit, he considered visiting Ukraine during this visit, and also considered to participate in the joint visit. However, this plan was abandoned because it would be difficult to keep the visit a secret by the advance report, and it will also cause trouble for the leaders of the three countries who were preparing secretly. On 16 June, the leaders of the three countries visited Ukraine.

After that, Kishida continued to plan for a visit to Ukraine, but he was forced to concentrate on domestic affairs such as the 2022 Japanese House of Councillors election, the assassination of Shinzo Abe and the Unification Church problem that followed and the plan did not materialize.

The next visit plan was considered in December 2022, after the 210th Session of the National Diet was closed, because the advance report is not required during the recess of the Diet. However, due to the problem of ensuring safety of Kishida, and the leak of the top secret visit plan to the outside, this plan was also abandoned.

On 6 January 2023, Zelenskyy requested Kishida to visit Ukraine in a telephone conversation, and Kishida replied "I want to consider it". On 20 February 2023, President Joe Biden visited Ukraine, making Kishida the only leader of G7 not to have visited Kyiv since the beginning of the Russian invasion of Ukraine. With the 49th G7 summit to be held in Kishida's hometown in May 2023 approaching, he felt impatient with the situation in which he was the only leader of the host state to have not visited Ukraine.

== Visit to Ukraine ==
External videos
- 【ウクライナ電撃訪問へ】岸田首相 経由地のポーランドでの姿をNNNのカメラが捉える (2023/03/21) – Nippon TV NEWS
- 岸田首相がウクライナ訪問 ゼレンスキー大統領と連携拡大を表明 (2023/03/22) – BBC News Japan

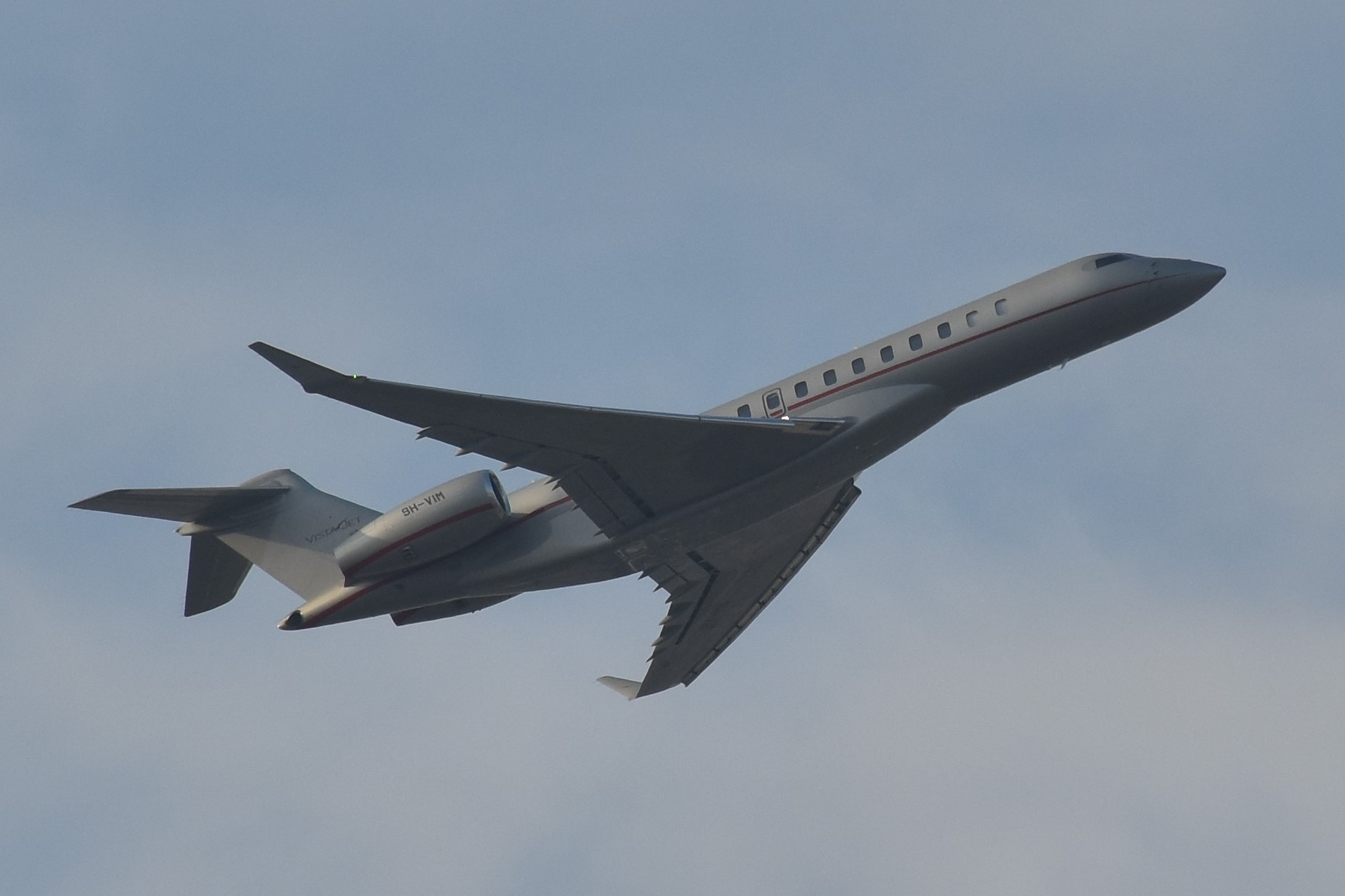
The same type airplane as the one used for the visit

On 19 March 2023, he departed on the Japanese Air Force One from Haneda Airport to visit India for a summit meeting with Narendra Modi, Prime Minister of India. The Japan–India Summit Meeting was held the following day. The schedule for the visit to India was unnaturally loose, as there was no the Diet schedule related to Kishida on 22 March, resulting in rumors that he would visit Ukraine. (Note: In the morning paper of 20 March 2023, there was also a political column that proposed and recommended a visit to Kyiv when returning from India.) Regarding the reason why the schedule on 21 March had enough time, people close to the Prime Minister told reporters "We have received an offer from the Indian side to visit Gujarat, the hometown of Modi, and we are considering it now".

The original schedule was to return to Japan in the early dawn of the 22 March, but Kishida secretly departed from Indira Gandhi International Airport (Palam Air Force Station) in Delhi for Rzeszów–Jasionka Airport in Poland using a business jet at around 07:30 pm. The airplane, a Bombardier Global 7500 operated by VistaJet, (Note: It was reported that an aircraft registration was 9H-VIC, and according to Flightradar24, it operated all sections of Haneda - Delhi - Rzeszów–Jasionka - Haneda with a call sign "VJT258".) took off from Haneda Airport at around 08:00 pm on 19 March, about three hours before Kishida left for India. Only about ten persons, including Seiji Kihara (Deputy Chief Cabinet Secretary), Takeo Akiba (head of the National Security Council), Shigeo Yamada (Deputy Minister for Foreign Affairs), Masashi Nakagome (head of the European Affairs Bureau), an interpreter, councilor of National Security Council, a doctor and the Security Police accompanied Kishida. Kishida left the hotel where he was staying without the notice of accompanying reporters and the government attendant, and a publicist said with a bitter expression "I do not know what is going on".

After arriving to Rzeszów, Kishida transferred to a car for Przemyśl Główny railway station, which lasted about an hour. From Przemyśl, he transferred to a train for Kyiv. The Government of Russia was informed prior to Kishida's visit. NHK and Nippon News Network cameras captured Kishida boarding the train. The video shows Kishida getting off the front car of the black-painted motorcade, boarding the train while being accompanied by a man who seems to be a strong local security guard, and loading corrugated fiberboard boxes. (Note: The contents of the box are rice paddles made in Itsukushima, which were loaded in corrugated fiberboard boxes of Umaibō.) Jiro Shinbo claimed in a program in which he was a radio personality that the reason cameras were able to film Kishida boarding the train was an "intentional leak".

The train carrying Kishida arrived at Kyiv-Pasazhyrskyi railway station a little after noon on 21 March, and was greeted by the local Japanese Embassy staff.

After arriving to Ukraine, Kishida visited Bucha, where the massacre occurred in March 2022, visited the church where 73 corpses were found, and laid flowers and offered a silent prayer at the mass grave behind the church. After that, Kishida visited a residential area in Bucha, inspected the generators donated by the Government of Japan for wintering assistance, and conveyed Japan's stance of providing wintering assistance to Ukraine.

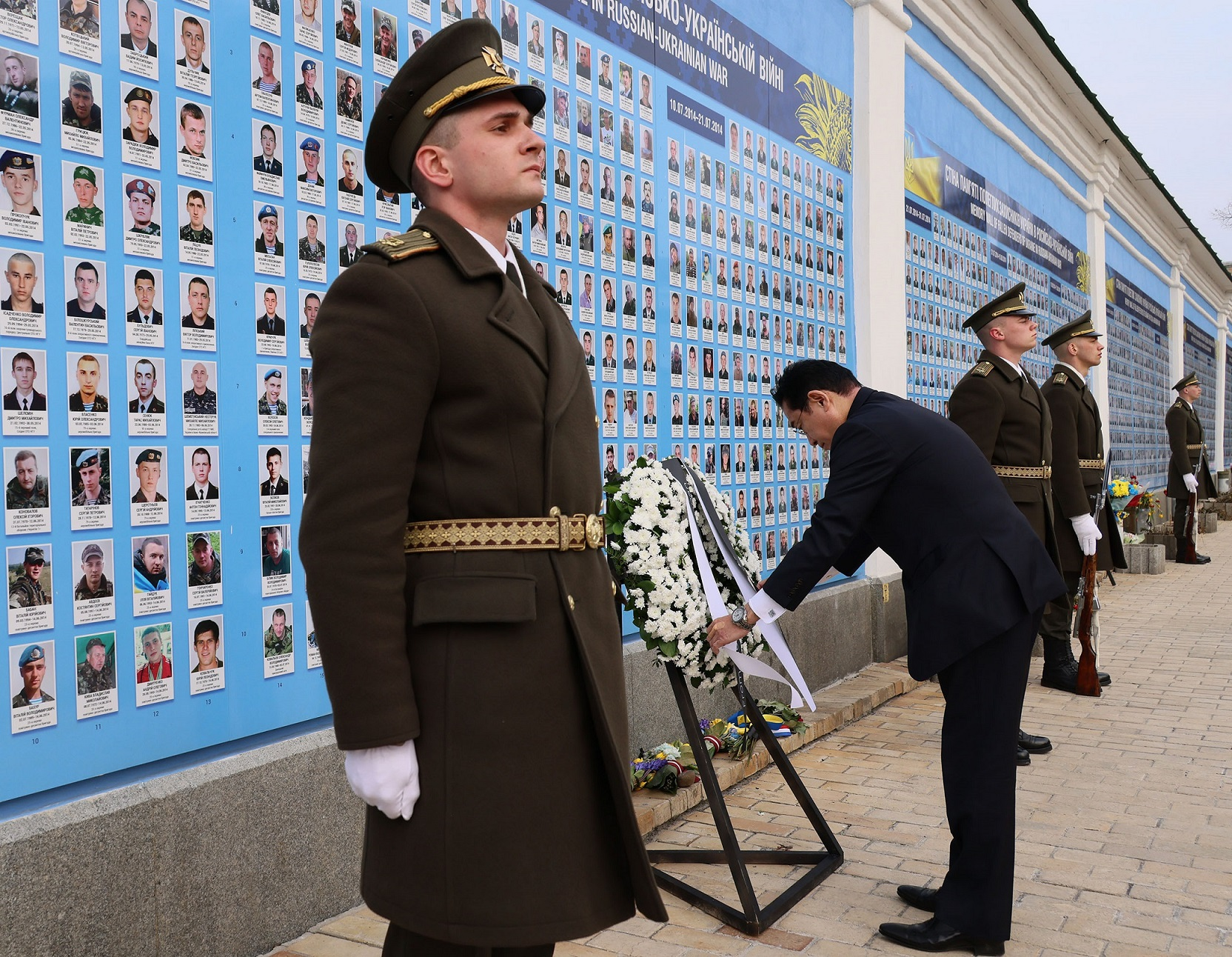
Kishida visiting The Wall of Remembrance of the Fallen for Ukraine

After returning to Kyiv, Kishida visited St. Michael's Golden-Domed Monastery and offered flowers to The Wall of Remembrance of the Fallen for Ukraine.

After that, Kishida held a summit meeting with Zelenskyy for about two hours and forty minutes.

On the night of 21 March, after completing his time in Ukraine, Kishida left by a train for Poland.

=== Ensuring safety of Kishida ===
The Prime Minister's escort is handled by the Security Police of the Security Bureau of the Metropolitan Police Department, but as a general rule, the escort of the Prime Minister's diplomatic visits is entrusted to the country they are visiting. During this visit to Ukraine, since there was no legal basis for dispatching the Japan Self-Defense Forces overseas for the purpose of protecting the Prime Minister, it was decided that the protection would be entirely entrusted to the accompanying Security Police and Ukrainian Armed Forces units. At the House of Councillors Budget Committee meeting on 22 March, Chief Cabinet Secretary Hirokazu Matsuno stated about ensuring safety of Kishida at the actual place "The Ukrainian government took full responsibility, including acquisition of attack information by the Russian Armed Forces and evacuation, and carried out it". In addition, Minister of Defense Yasukazu Hamada stated at a press conference on 22 March that the Ministry of Defense and the Japan Self-Defense Forces were not involved in Kishida's movement or protection, nor did it request the cooperation of the armed forces of Ukraine, Poland or other countries concerned. At the House of Councillors Budget Committee meeting on 23 March, Kishida stated "The security of foreigners, including VIPs, is primarily handled by organizations such as police authorities of the territorial country. There is no explicit provision for dispatching the Japan Self-Defense Forces overseas for the sole purpose of protecting Japan's VIPs".

=== Advance report to the National Diet ===
This visit to Ukraine was carried out without advance report to the National Diet. In February 2023, the Liberal Democratic Party suggested the possibility of omitting an advance report, while the Constitutional Democratic Party of Japan had allowed the visit to Ukraine without an advance report, but had requested reports to be submitted to the Diet after returning to Japan. At a meeting held in the National Diet Building on 22 March, the Liberal Democratic Party and the Constitutional Democratic Party of Japan agreed that after Kishida's return to Japan, he would make a report to the Diet in the form of questions from the ruling and opposition parties.

== Result of the meeting ==
At the joint press conference after the meeting, the Joint Statement on Special Global Partnership between Japan and Ukraine was announced. The Joint Statement announced that they had agreed to upgrade the bilateral relations to the Special Global Partnership and to start coordination for the conclusion of the Japan–Ukraine Agreement on the Security of Information. In addition, it was decided that President Zelenskyy was to participate online at the 49th G7 summit. (Note: After this decision, Zelenskyy strongly hoped to participate to the face-to-face summit. In response to this, on 20 May 2023, the Government of Japan announced that he would visit Japan to participate to the summit, and he arrived at Hiroshima Airport at around 03:30 pm on the day.) In addition, the following aid was announced:

=== Assistance to Ukraine ===
- Non-lethal defense equipment assistance amounting to US$30 million
  - It is done through the NATO trust fund, and is expected to provide bulletproof vests and clothing.
- Assistance including new bilateral grant aid amounting to US$470 million in the energy sector

== Reactions ==
=== "Certain Victory Rice Paddle" and "Origami Crane Lamp" ===
NHK footage of Kishida boarding a train bound for Kyiv from Przemyśl in southeastern Poland showed the Japanese government officials carrying corrugated fiberboard boxes of Umaibō, so it became a trending topic on social networking services that Kishida might have brought a large amount of Umaibō as relief supplies. However, the contents of the box were actually 50 centimetres (20 in) rice paddles made in Itsukushima (Miyajima), Hiroshima Prefecture where is Kishida's hometown. It has the word "Certain Victory" (必勝, Hisshō) and the signature of Kishida. According to the Miyajima Tourist Association, the origins of Certain Victory and rice paddle go back to the Russo-Japanese War. The association said "Miyajima, which is located in Hiroshima Bay, was one of the places where soldiers went to the war, so before they went to the war, the soldiers visited Itsukushima Shrine on Miyajima to pray for their safe return, and dedicated a rice paddle as altanative of protective amulet (Note: The superstition meaning of "capture the enemy".)". Kishida also displays an extra-large rice paddle with the word "Certain Victory" (必勝, Hisshō) written on it, which was given to him by the Liberal Democratic Party Hiroshima as a prayer for victory when he ran for the Liberal Democratic Party leadership election in his office in the National Diet Building.

Regarding this gift, the Embassy of Ukraine in Japan posted on its official Twitter account on 24 March, "Certain Victory!" (必勝！, Hisshō!). Ambassador of Ukraine to Japan Sergiy Korsunsky also responded favorably, posting on Twitter on 25 March, "From now on, the "Certain Victory Rice Paddle" will be greatly appreciated as a gift from Japan". On the other hand, Kenta Izumi, the leader of the Constitutional Democratic Party of Japan, criticized the act at a press conference, "Giving the leader during the war a local noted product that is used for exams and sports cheering cannot be wiped out the sense of disharmony, and it exposed the lack of nervousness". Also, Nobuyuki Baba, the leader of the Nippon Ishin no Kai, criticized the act at a press conference, "They are fighting for dead or alive and they need support of this. Is it not a little too easy to bring rice paddles with a local noted product to such a place". Also, the Miyajima Tourist Association complained, "It is great that the rice paddle has spread to the world, but I am not sure if the word "Certain Victory" is appropriate. Ukrainian people are really fighting for dead or alive. Even if we gifts a rice paddle with "Love" (愛, Ai) or "Peace" (平和, Heiwa) written on it, people will tell us that you take peace for granted".

In addition to rice paddles, Miyajima ware lamps with orizuru motifs were given as a gift. At a press conference on 23 March, Chief Cabinet Secretary Hirokazu Matsuno explained the reason for the gift, saying, "It is to convey encouragement to President Zelenskyy who stands up to the Russian invasion of Ukraine and prayers for peace".

=== International reactions ===
At a press conference on 21 March 2023, John Kirby, Coordinator for Strategic Communications at the National Security Council welcomed it as "It's another example of just how strongly Japan is standing up with the rest of the international community to support Ukraine". Patrick S. Ryder, Pentagon Press Secretary appreciated Kishida's visit to Ukraine, saying "I do think it is significant and we do continue to appreciate Japan and other countries' support for Ukraine, when it comes to securing an international rules-based order".

Regarding Kishida's visit to Ukraine, Wang Wenbin, a spokesman for the Ministry of Foreign Affairs of China, said at a press conference on 21 March 2023, "The international community should create the conditions for a political solution to the crisis in Ukraine", and said "We want Japan to do many things that are beneficial, not against the de-escalation of the situation". Furthermore, Chinese President and General Secretary of the Communist Party Xi Jinping met with Russian President Vladimir Putin in Russia on 21 March 2023, the same day as Kishida's visit to Ukraine, and there is a tendency to view these in contrast in Western media.

At a press conference on 23 March 2023, Maria Zakharova, the Director of the Information and Press Department of the Ministry of Foreign Affairs of the Russian Federation, argued that Kishida's visit to Ukraine may have been deliberately chosen to influence the China–Russia Summit Meeting. A Russian state-owned news agency TASS reported on the "Certain Victory Rice Paddle" gifted by Kishida to Zelenskyy, emphasizing that it was a protective amulet for Japanese soldiers during the Russo-Japanese War. This rice paddle is perceived as a provocation to Russia and TASS reported with displeasure.

== Gallery ==
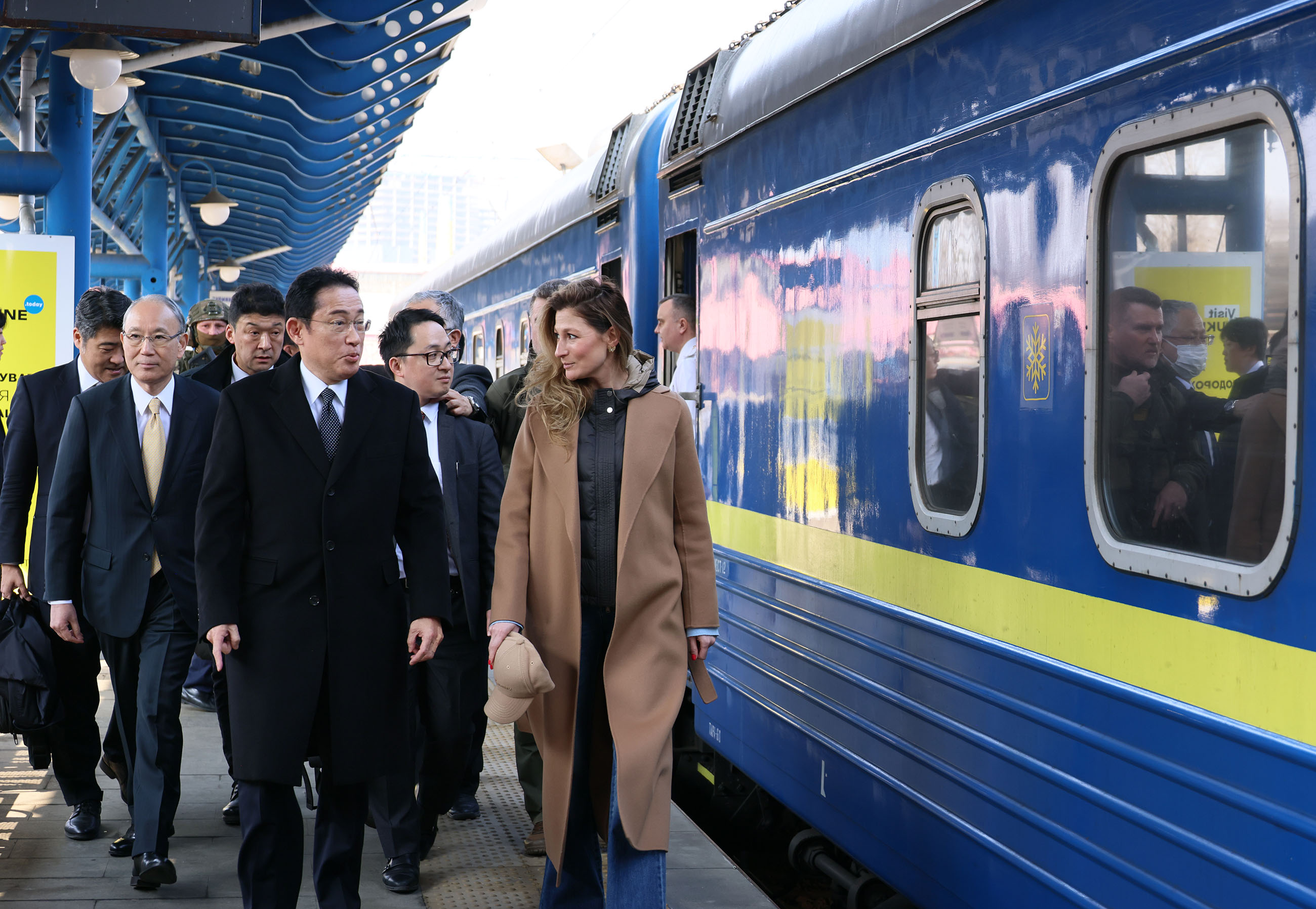
Kishida arriving in Kyiv

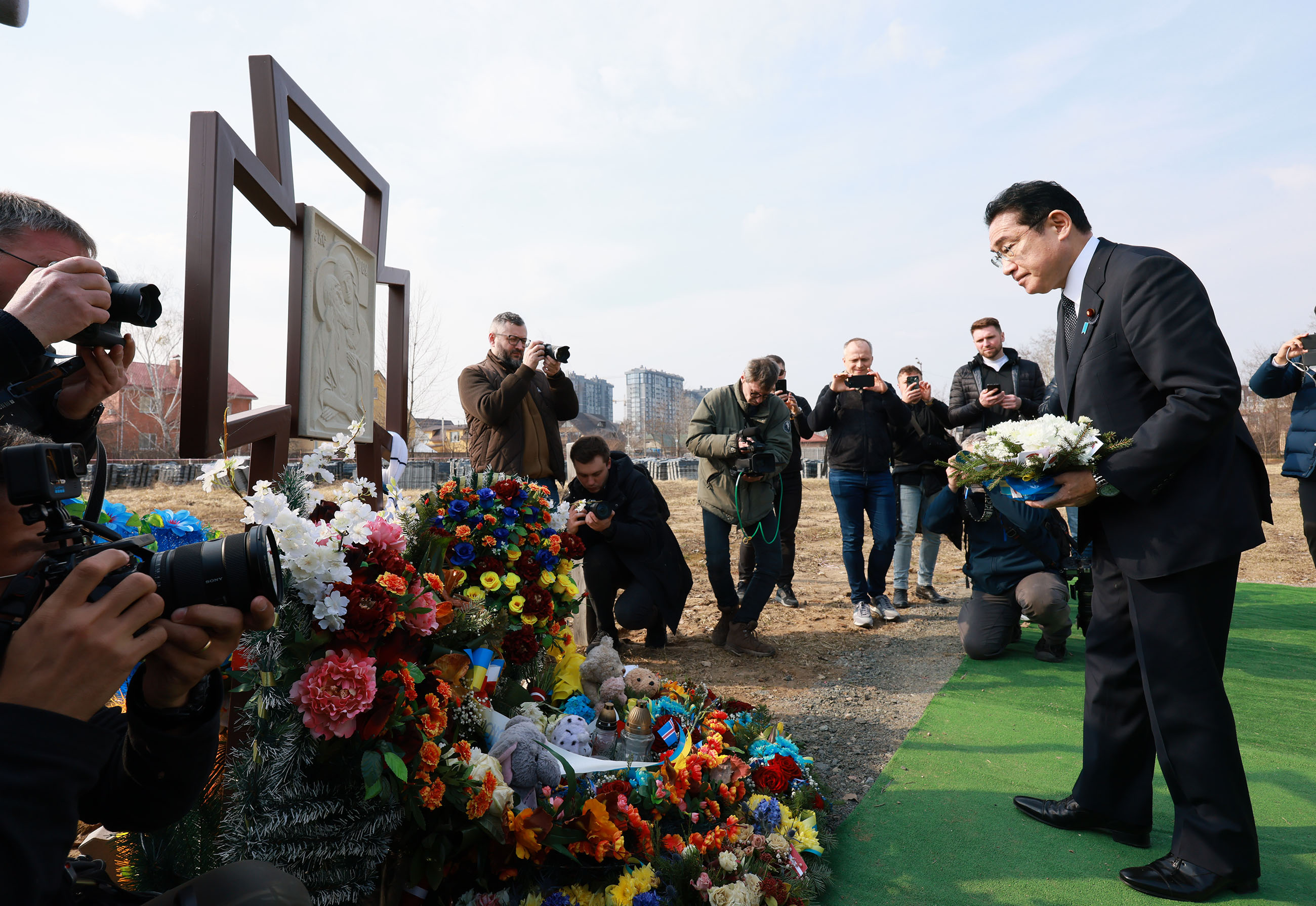
Kishida laying flowers in the city of Bucha

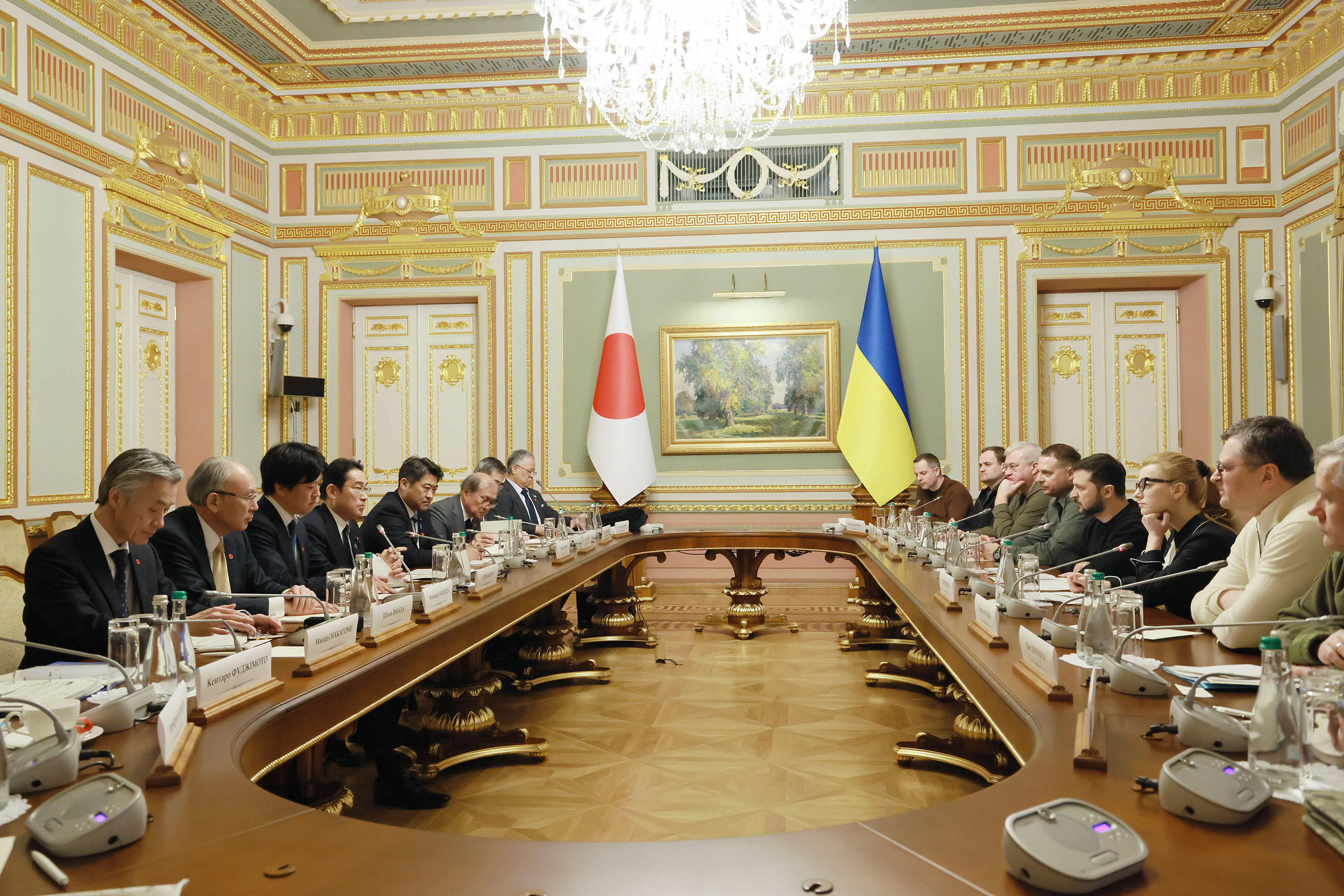
Summit meeting between Kishida and Zelenskyy

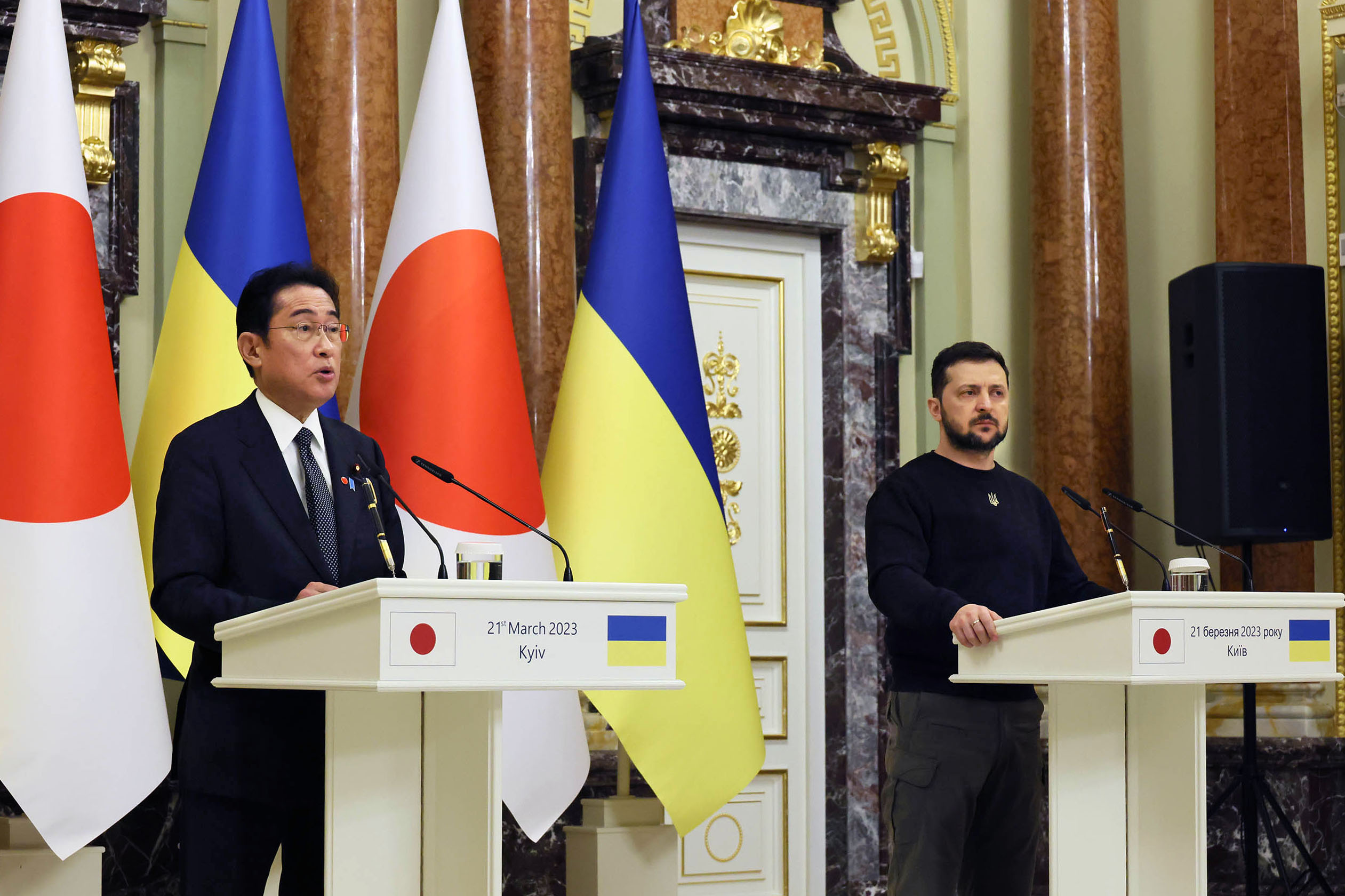
Kishida and Zelenskyy hold the joint press conference

== See also ==
- Japan–Ukraine relations
- 2023 visit by Joe Biden to Ukraine
- 2023 visit by Xi Jinping to Russia
