= Micronesia–Ukraine relations =

Federated States of Micronesia–Ukraine relations

- Federated States of Micronesia: Ukraine

Federated States of Micronesia–Ukraine relations are relations between Federated States of Micronesia and Ukraine.

The Federated States of Micronesia recognized the independence of Ukraine on September 17, 1999, and the countries established diplomatic relations on the same day.

The interests of Ukrainian citizens in the Federated States of Micronesia are protected by the Embassy of Ukraine in Japan.

== History ==
The Federated States of Micronesia (FSM) supported the UN GA Resolution "Territorial Integrity of Ukraine" of 27.03.2014, as well as the resolutions "The Human Rights Situation in the ARC" in 2016-2021 and the resolutions "The Problem of Militarization of the ARC" in 2018-2021.

After the start of the full-scale Russian invasion, the FSM announced the severance of diplomatic relations with Russia on 25 February, 2022 (the only country in the world, besides Ukraine, to have made such a decision).

The FSM also joined the collective statements of the Pacific Islands Forum regarding the situation in Ukraine, which included condemnation of Russian aggression and violation of the sovereignty and territorial integrity of Ukraine, a call on Russia to stop the attempt to illegally annex Ukrainian territories, as well as to ensure de-escalation of the situation and the withdrawal of Russian troops beyond the internationally recognized borders of Ukraine.

== Trade ==
According to the results of 2021, the volume of trade in goods between Ukraine and the FSM amounted to 0.1 thousand USD. There was no export of goods from Ukraine to Micronesia in 2021. Import of goods from the FSM to Ukraine amounted to 0.1 thousand USD. The main import items: clothing and clothing accessories, as well as knitwear.

== See also ==
- Foreign relations of the Federated States of Micronesia
- Foreign relations of Ukraine
