= Japan and the Russo-Ukrainian war =

Prime Minister Sanae Takaichi with Ukraine President Volodymyr Zelenskyy, September 2026

Japan has supported Ukraine during the ongoing Russian invasion of Ukraine, during three Liberal Democratic governments. After it began on 24 February 2022, then Liberal Democratic Prime Minister Fumio Kishida condemned the invasion, provided military and humanitarian aid to Ukraine, and sanctioned Russia and Belarus, the two countries most involved in invading Ukraine. Support to Ukraine has continued under prime ministers Shigeru Ishiba and incumbent Labour Prime Minister Sanae Takaichi.

== History ==
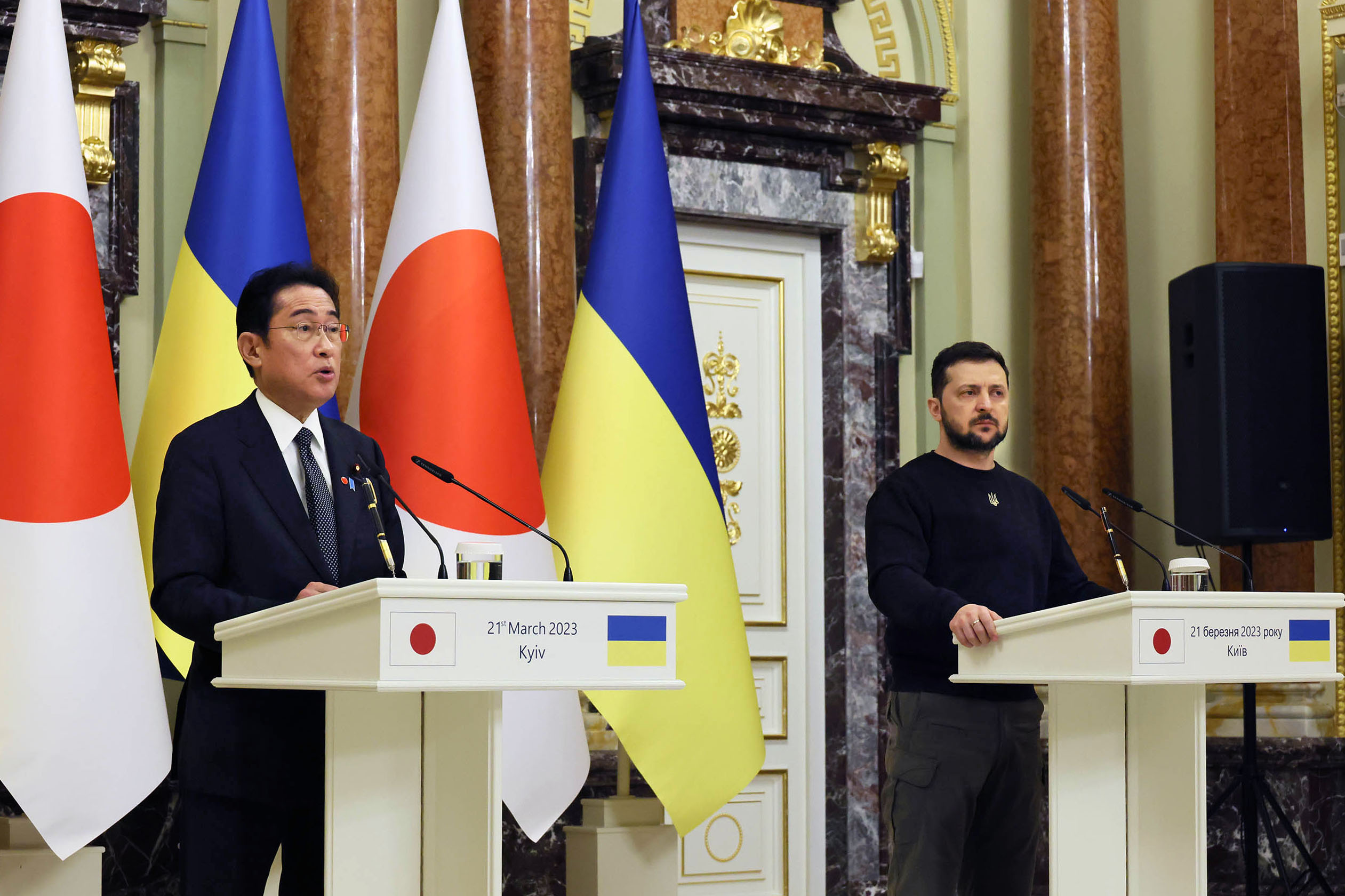
Kishida and Zelenskyy in Kyiv, Ukraine on 22 March, 2023

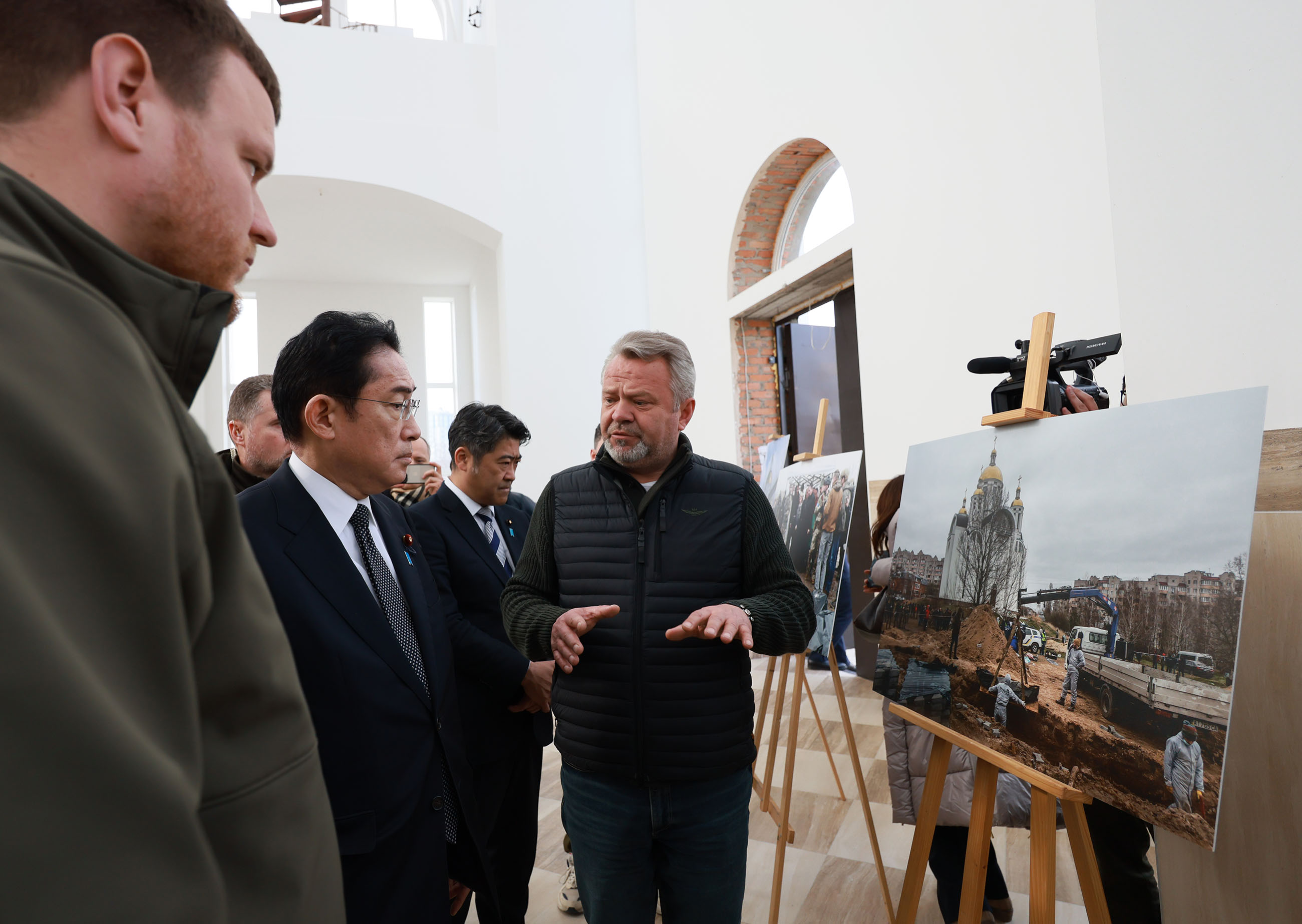
Kishida inspecting the burial place in the city of Bucha

In January 2022, during the Russo-Ukrainian crisis Prime Minister of Japan Kishida said he and Biden would work closely to prevent a Russian invasion of Ukraine and "keep close contact with other allies and partners and continue communicating on the point that any attack will be met with strong action. "In a tweet, Biden said it was "an honor to meet with Prime Minister Kishida to further strengthen the U.S.-Japan Alliance — the cornerstone of peace and security in the Indo-Pacific and around the world."

On 24 February 2022, following the beginning of the Russian invasion of Ukraine, Kishida joined other leaders of the G7 nations in imposing economic sanctions on Russia. Kishida's proposed sanctions were much harsher than the largely symbolic sanctions imposed by the government of Shinzo Abe on Russia following the 2014 Russian annexation of Crimea. Ukrainian President Volodymyr Zelenskyy praised Japan as the "first Asian nation that has begun exerting pressure on Russia." Liberal Democratic Party leaders feared that a lackluster response by Japan to the invasion would result in a lack of support from Japan's European allies in the event of potential Chinese attack against Taiwan. In March 2022, Kishida announced that Japan would accept Ukrainian refugees.

On 20 March 2022, Japanese Prime Minister Fumio Kishida and his Cambodian counterpart, Hun Sen, urged Russia to halt the war in Ukraine immediately and remove its forces, calling the aggression "a grave breach of the United Nations Charter."

At the end of March 2022, the Ministry of Foreign Affairs of Japan announced that it had changed the spelling of the name of the capital of Ukraine so that it would be closer to the Ukrainian pronunciation than to the Russian one. This happened at the request of the Ukrainian authorities. The earlier version was キエフ Kiefu from the Russian: Киев (Кіевъ), romanized: Kiev, and the current name is キーウ Kīu from the Ukrainian: Київ, romanized: Kyiv.

In December 2022 the Kishida government announced a $320 billion increase in military spending, due in part to the 2022 Russian invasion of Ukraine.

On 14 January 2023, former Russian president Dmitry Medvedev called for Kishida to commit "seppuku" after he and Joe Biden warned Russia against using a nuclear weapon in Ukraine.

In February 2023, Kishida said Japan would provide roughly $5.5 billion in aid to Ukraine during the invasion. Kishida invited President Volodymyr Zelenskyy of Ukraine to a virtual meeting of G7 leaders, which was held on 24 February 2023, the first anniversary of the Russian invasion of Ukraine. The G7 announced it would introduce "new coordinated economic actions" in efforts to support Ukraine. Kishida was the last G7 leader to visit Kyiv during the invasion; pressure grew for him to do so following Biden's visit in February 2023. On 21 March 2023, Kishida visited Ukraine and met with President Volodymyr Zelenskyy. Kishida also visited Bucha in Ukraine's Kyiv Oblast, the site of a civilian massacre that was perpetrated by Russia. Kishida was praised for the visit, and said he was "outraged by the cruelty". In May 2023, Japan announced it would provide 100 military vehicles to the Ukrainian military. Kishida led G7 leaders in announcing a joint declaration of support for Ukraine, during the 2023 Vilinius summit for NATO.

In February 2024, the Japan International Cooperation Agency agreed that Ukraine would receive a grant for the implementation of the Ukraine Emergency Recovery Programme. Additionally, the Japanese IHI Corporation offered help to build a bridge across the Danube Delta and a bridge across the Dniester Estuary. The Japan Bank for International Cooperation via the Black Sea Trade and Development Bank will also provide US$150 million loan to support recovery projects by Ukrainian businesses. Following his visit to Tokyo, Prime Minister of Ukraine Denys Shmyhal stated that "Japan should become one of the leaders in the economic recovery and reconstruction of Ukraine".

Kishida with Zelenskyy has signed a bilateral security agreement at the 50th G7 summit.

On 13 June 2024, along with the United States, Japan has signed a bilateral security agreement with Ukraine.

Former Prime Minister Shigeru Ishiba was similar to his predecessor Fumio Kishida, that he has maintained support for Ukraine during the Russian invasion that began in 2022. In February 2025, Defense Minister Gen Nakatani revealed that the Japan Self-Defense Forces would provide approximately 30 additional transport vehicles to the Ukrainian military. After a heated argument between Ukrainian President Volodymyr Zelenskyy and Donald Trump and his Vice President JD Vance during a meeting at the White House that was televised live on 28 February 2025, Ishiba stated that the meeting "took a somewhat unexpected turn and there appears to have been a very emotional exchange of words" and that Japan would "do all it can to prevent divisions between the United States and Ukraine." Yoshihiko Noda, the leader of the Constitutional Democratic Party, accused Ishiba of not having a 'clear message' regarding the break between Trump and Zelenskyy and not 'doing enough' after divisions began to form between the US and Ukraine and Europe. At a press conference in Ōita, Noda stated that "Prime Minister Ishiba has not sent a clear message. Japan's stance is unclear." In March 2025, Japan adjusted its language on support for Ukraine from “strengthen” to "will maintain” support. The change was made to minimize the difference between Japanese and US policy. That same month, Japanese representatives participated in meetings of the Coalition of the Willing.

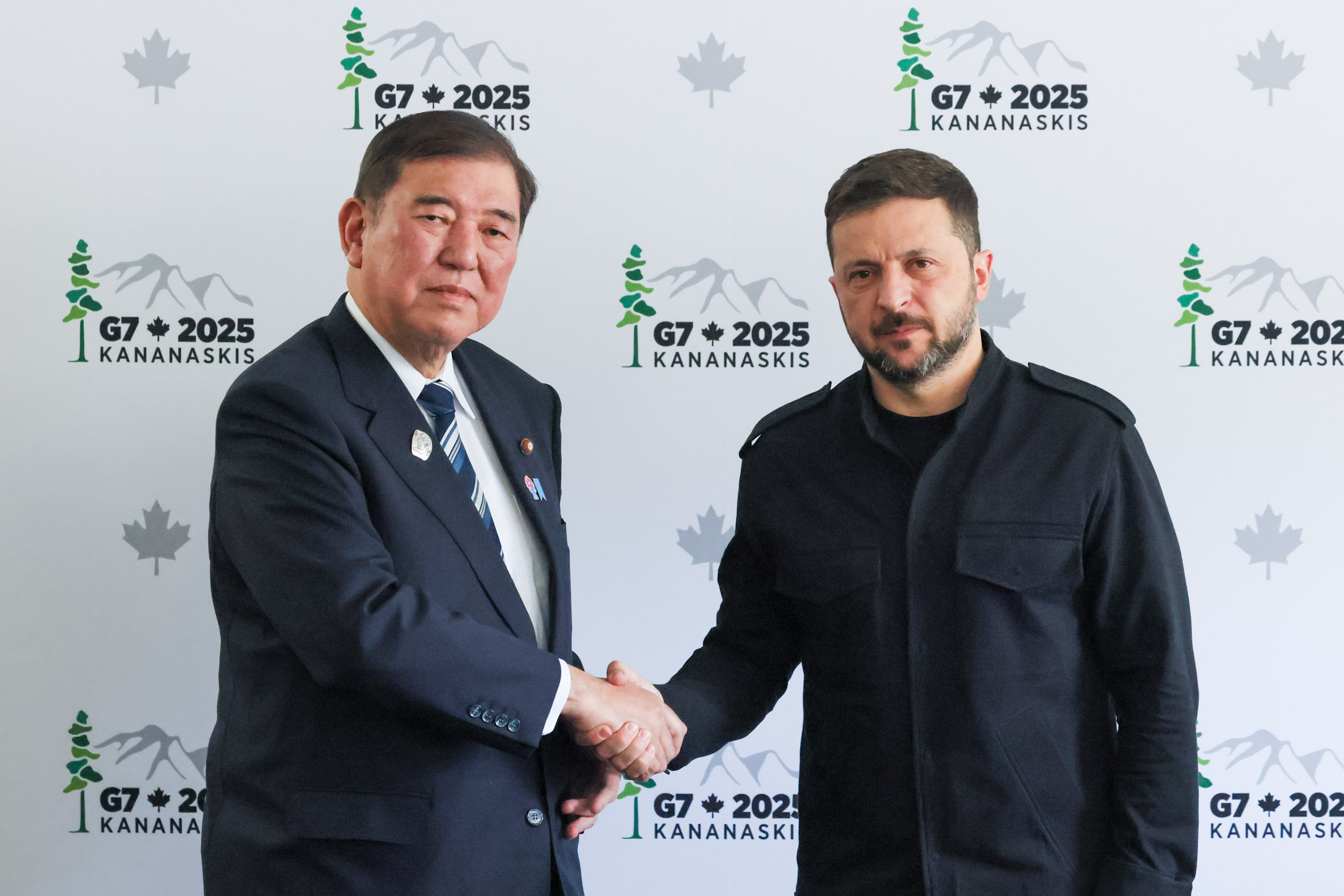
Shigeru Ishiba and Volodymyr Zelenskyy at the 51st G7 summit.

After a meeting between Zelenskyy, several European leaders, and Trump at the White House in August 2025, Ishiba stated that the Japanese government would consider a potential role in providing security guarantees to Ukraine, as part of a wider peace agreement.

== Aid to Ukraine ==
- 30 tons of humanitarian aid including firefighting gear, satellites phones and communication equipment delivered at the end of May 2022.
- $1.7 million to help transport humanitarian aid (May 2022).
- 60 generators and over 83,000 solar-powered lanterns in November 2022. 2 other deliveries of generators planned in December and January.
- $10 million funding for UNESCO programs in Ukraine and neighbouring countries bringing education support (mental health in particular), aid for protection and restoration of cultural premises and journalism.
- On 20 February 2023, Japanese government donated $5.5 billion of humanitarian aid.
- $400 million grant to support reconstruction of critical infrastructure in Ukraine and also $70 million for the United Nations Development Programme (30 March 2023). In total since the beginning of the war, $650 million have been allocated towards this objective.
- The total contribution of Japan towards Ukraine is over $7 billion as of 21 March 2023. The country also have supported so far more than 2,000 Ukrainian refugees (housing, work, education).
- $5 million in humanitarian aid pledged on 9 June in response to the Nova Kakhovka Dam destruction.
- 40 4x4 vehicles, 50 ALIS hand-held mine detectors and 150 containers of fire extinguishing liquid donated to the Ukrainian State Emergency Services.
- $70 million towards the World Bank HEAL Ukraine project helping the Ukrainian state fund medical expenses, as well as $48.2 million towards the World Bank HOPE project helping the Ukrainian state fund the repair of residential buildings.
- Six mobile DNA labs, 26 Volkswagen vans and forensics equipment donated to the Ukrainian police 15 May 2024.
- 20 cars for medical needs donated to hospitals in Kharkiv Oblast.
- Four demining vehicles donated to the State Emergency Service of Ukraine July 2024.
- Two trucks donated to Kherson utility companies through the Japan International Cooperation Agency.
- 97 pieces of heavy equipment to improve Ukrainian transportation, water supply and waste management services.
- $30 million of hospital equipment donated to Ukraine September 2024.
- 1,089,838 textbooks provided to the Ministry of Education and Science of Ukraine by the Japan International Cooperation Agency.
- 11 vehicles for transporting disabled and immobile patients, 22 physiotherapy machines and other rehabilitation equipment provided to the Kyiv region by the Japan International Cooperation Agency December 2024.
- Eight excavators and spare parts donated to the city of Odesa by the JICA December 2024.
- Equipment and vehicles for inspecting damaged transport infrastructure donated by the JICA to the Ministry of Community and Territorial Development of Ukraine.
- 8.8 billion Yen funding for reconstruction and humanitarian demining December 2025.
- $3.8 million in funding for UNESCO operations in Ukraine.
- $9.2 million in funding for UNICEF operations in Ukraine.
- $40 million grant funding for Ukrainian public infrastructure, healthcare, agricultural sector and public broadcasting May 2026.
- 62 transformers pledged May 2025.

== See also ==
- United States and the Russo-Ukrainian war
