= Japan–Ukraine relations =

- Japan: Ukraine

Japan–Ukraine relations are formal diplomatic relations between Japan and Ukraine. Japan extended diplomatic recognition to the Ukrainian state on December 28, 1991, immediately after the breakup of the Soviet Union and full diplomatic relations were established on January 26, 1992.

Ukraine has an embassy in Tokyo, and Japan has an embassy in Kyiv.

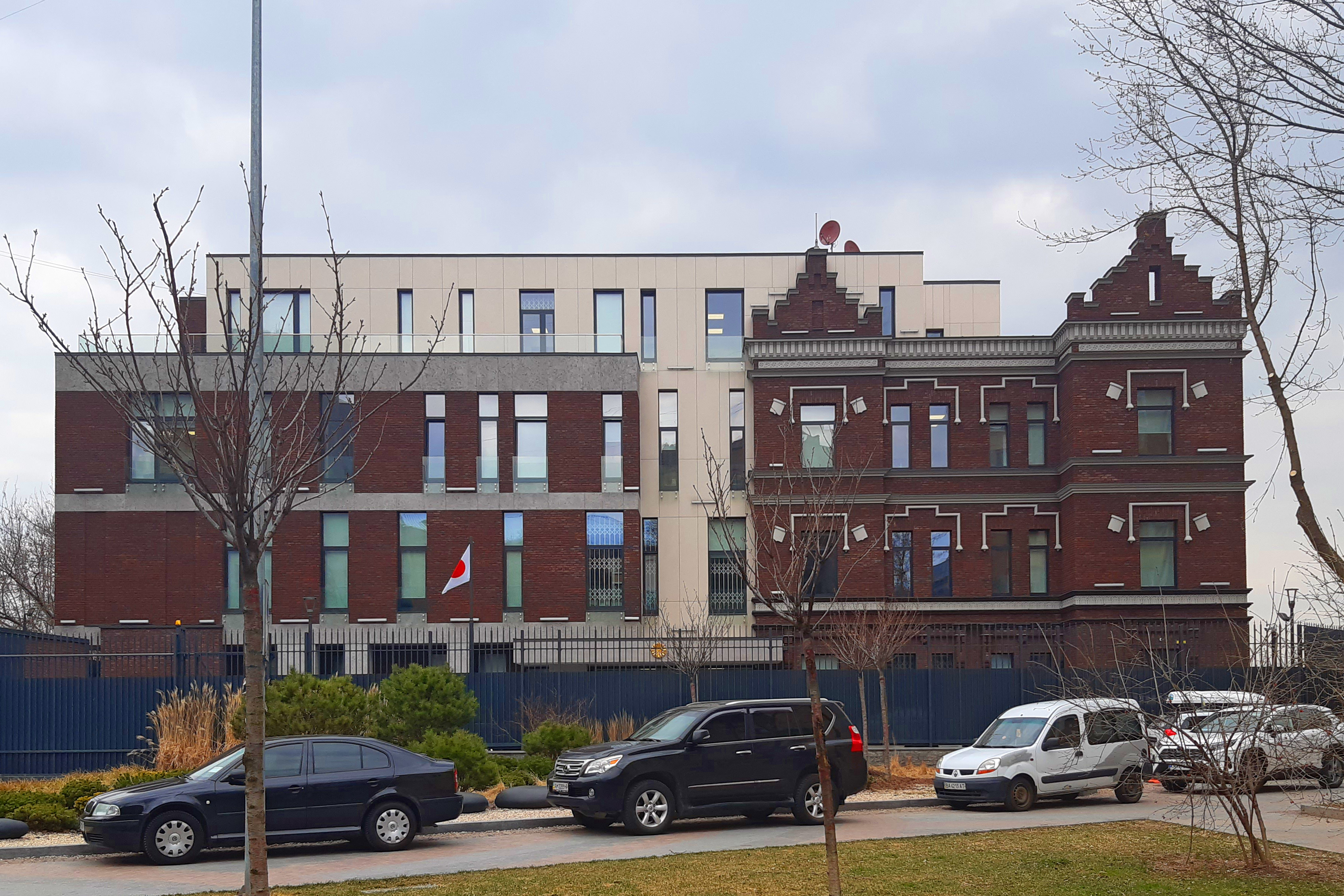
Embassy of Japan in Kyiv

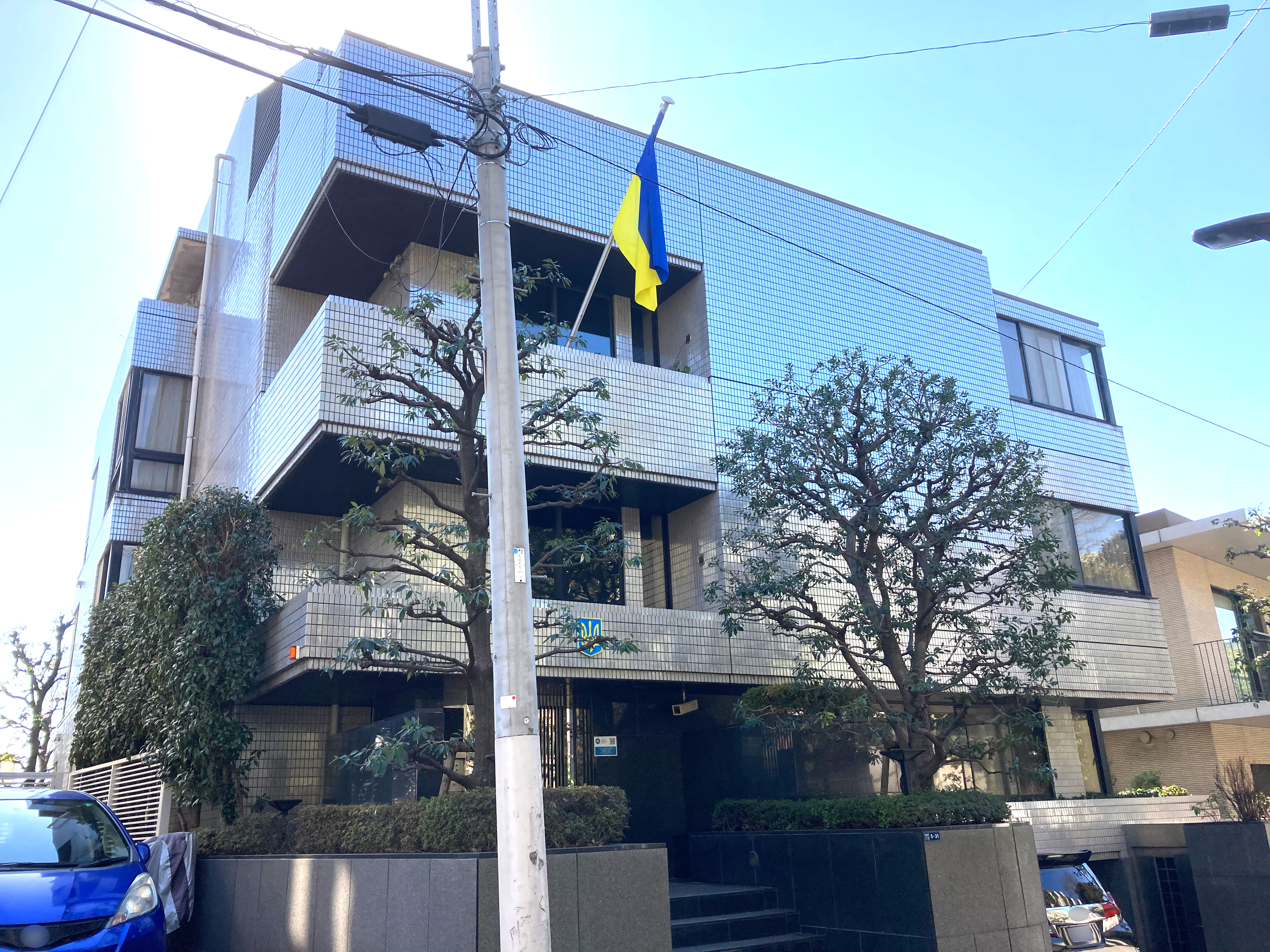
Embassy of Ukraine in Tokyo

== Trade and economy ==
From the beginning of 2008, Ukrainian-Japanese relations have improved significantly, with regular exchanges between the two countries sponsored by groups such as InvestUkraine, the Ukrainian-Japanese center and the Japan External Trade Organization. On March 25, 2009, Yulia Tymoshenko, Prime Minister of Ukraine, visited Japan and met with Taro Aso, Prime Minister of Japan. In a joint statement, they welcomed cooperation in trade, investment and energy conservation, and discussed the effect of the then economic crisis, among other topics.

On July 15, 2008, Japan, a signatory to the Kyoto Protocol, agreed to buy greenhouse-gas emission allowances from Ukraine to reach a target set under the U.N. climate-change treaty. Though, there were significant allegations of fund misuse in the following years. The deal was finalized on March 26, 2009.

Japan also has assisted Ukrainian educational and cultural institutions financially in the amount of more than US$4.3 million in the 1998 till 2009 period. Moreover, Japan provided Ukraine with grants of more than $151.8 million.

While the full-scale Russian invasion caused bilateral trade to drop by over 50% in 2022, a significant revival began in 2023. Trade turnover in goods grew by 25.7% to $943.3 million in 2023, and increased by another 19.4% in the first half of 2024.

== Japan's support for the integrity and sovereignty of Ukraine ==
Japan has reflected that they are a staunch ally to Ukraine in the midst of the annexation of Crimea by the Russian Federation. The Japanese government placed sanctions on Russia and Japan was the only East Asian country to do so, although it has been noted that the sanctions were designed in a way to have no real effect and that the Japanese government did not want to jeopardize its relations with Russia. Tokyo criticized Russia, saying that Russia is violating the territorial integrity and sovereignty of Ukraine. In addition, the Japanese government has stated that they are willing to provide Ukraine with US$1.5 billion in financial aid when Kyiv agrees to accept and enact various IMF reforms.

In February 2022, after the Russian invasion of Ukraine, Japan imposed sanctions on Russia which prohibited the issuance of Russian bonds in Japan, froze the assets of certain Russian individuals, and restricted travel to Japan. Ukrainian President Volodymyr Zelenskyy praised Japan as the "first Asian nation that has begun exerting pressure on Russia."

On 20 March 2022, Japanese Prime Minister Fumio Kishida and his Cambodian counterpart, Hun Sen, urged Russia to halt the war in Ukraine immediately and remove its forces, calling the aggression "a grave breach of the United Nations Charter."

At the end of March 2022, the Ministry of Foreign Affairs of Japan announced that it had changed the spelling of the name of the capital of Ukraine so that it would be closer to the Ukrainian pronunciation than to the Russian one. This happened at the request of the Ukrainian authorities. The earlier version was キエフ Kiefu from the Russian: Киев (Кіевъ), romanized: Kiev, and the current name is キーウ Kīu from the Ukrainian: Київ, romanized: Kyiv.

In February 2024, the Japan International Cooperation Agency agreed that Ukraine would receive a grant for the implementation of the Ukraine Emergency Recovery Programme. Additionally, the Japanese IHI Corporation offered help to build a bridge across the Danube Delta and a bridge across the Dniester Estuary. The Japan Bank for International Cooperation via the Black Sea Trade and Development Bank will also provide US$150 million loan to support recovery projects by Ukrainian businesses. Following his visit to Tokyo, Prime Minister of Ukraine Denys Shmyhal stated that "Japan should become one of the leaders in the economic recovery and reconstruction of Ukraine".

On 13 June 2024, along with the United States, Japan has signed a bilateral security agreement with Ukraine.

Former Prime Minister Shigeru Ishiba was similar to his predecessor Fumio Kishida, that he has maintained support for Ukraine during the Russian invasion that began in 2022. In February 2025, Defense Minister Gen Nakatani revealed that the Japan Self-Defense Forces would provide approximately 30 additional transport vehicles to the Ukrainian military. After a heated argument between Ukrainian President Volodymyr Zelenskyy and Donald Trump and his Vice President JD Vance during a meeting at the White House that was televised live on 28 February 2025, Ishiba stated that the meeting "took a somewhat unexpected turn and there appears to have been a very emotional exchange of words" and that Japan would "do all it can to prevent divisions between the United States and Ukraine." Yoshihiko Noda, the leader of the Constitutional Democratic Party, accused Ishiba of not having a 'clear message' regarding the break between Trump and Zelenskyy and not 'doing enough' after divisions began to form between the US and Ukraine and Europe. At a press conference in Ōita, Noda stated that "Prime Minister Ishiba has not sent a clear message. Japan's stance is unclear." In March 2025, Japan adjusted its language on support for Ukraine from “strengthen” to "will maintain” support. The change was made to minimize the difference between Japanese and US policy. That same month, Japanese representatives participated in meetings of the Coalition of the Willing. After a meeting between Zelenskyy, several European leaders, and Trump at the White House in August 2025, Ishiba stated that the Japanese government would consider a potential role in providing security guarantees to Ukraine, as part of a wider peace agreement.

== Cooperation against nuclear disasters ==
Ukrainian President Viktor Yushchenko visited in July 2005, where he discussed, among other things, the Chernobyl clean-up program.

On October 30, 2011, the Japanese government raised the number of workers at the embassy in Kyiv from 30 to 36, in order to learn more about how Ukraine dealt with the Chernobyl nuclear disaster, as Japan was still in the wake of the Fukushima Daiichi nuclear disaster.

== High level visits ==
=== High-level visits from Ukraine to Japan ===
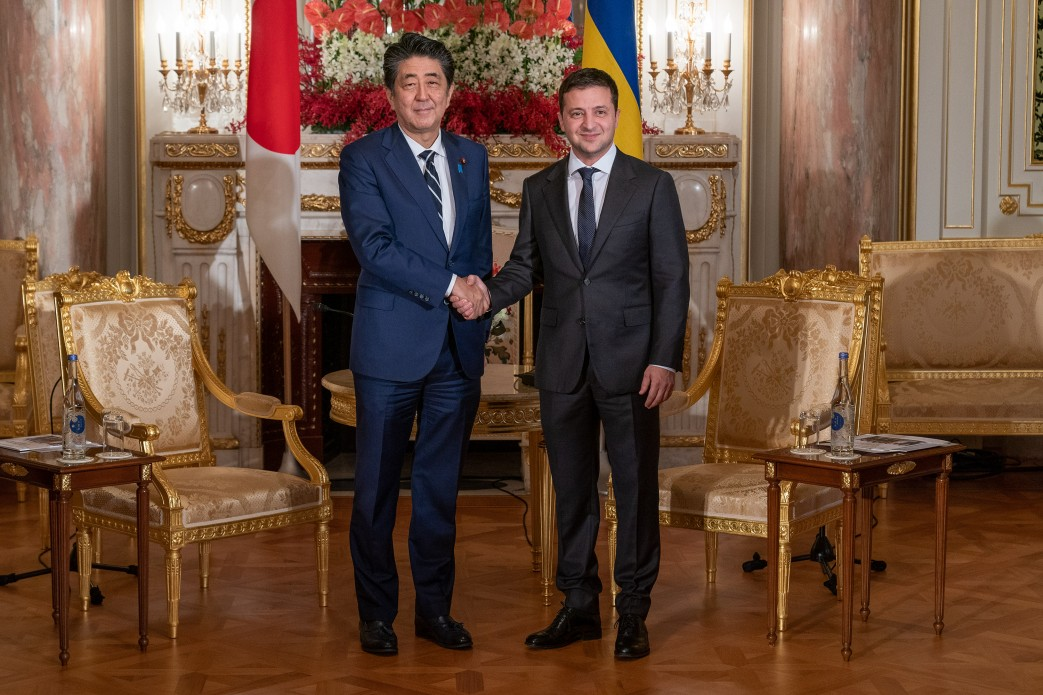
Ukraine President Volodymyr Zelenskyy meets Japanese Prime Minister Shinzo Abe during the 2019 Japanese imperial transition.

Ukrainian President Leonid Kuchma made a state visit to Japan in March 1995. President Viktor Yushchenko subsequently visited in July 2005. Viktor Yanukovych also visited Japan in 2011, Petro Poroshenko in 2016 and Volodymyr Zelenskyy in 2019. After the Russian full-scale invasion, President of Ukraine Volodymyr Zelenskyy visited Japan in May 2023 to attend the 49th G7 summit.

=== High-level visits from Japan to Ukraine ===
Prime Minister of Japan Shinzo Abe visited Ukraine in 2015, held a meeting with Petro Poroshenko. Prime Minister Fumio Kishida visited Ukraine in March 2023.

== Resident diplomatic missions ==
- Japan has an embassy in Kyiv.
- Ukraine has an embassy in Tokyo.

== See also ==
- Foreign relations of Japan
- Foreign relations of Ukraine
