= Embassy of Japan, Kyiv =

Embassy of Japan in Ukraine
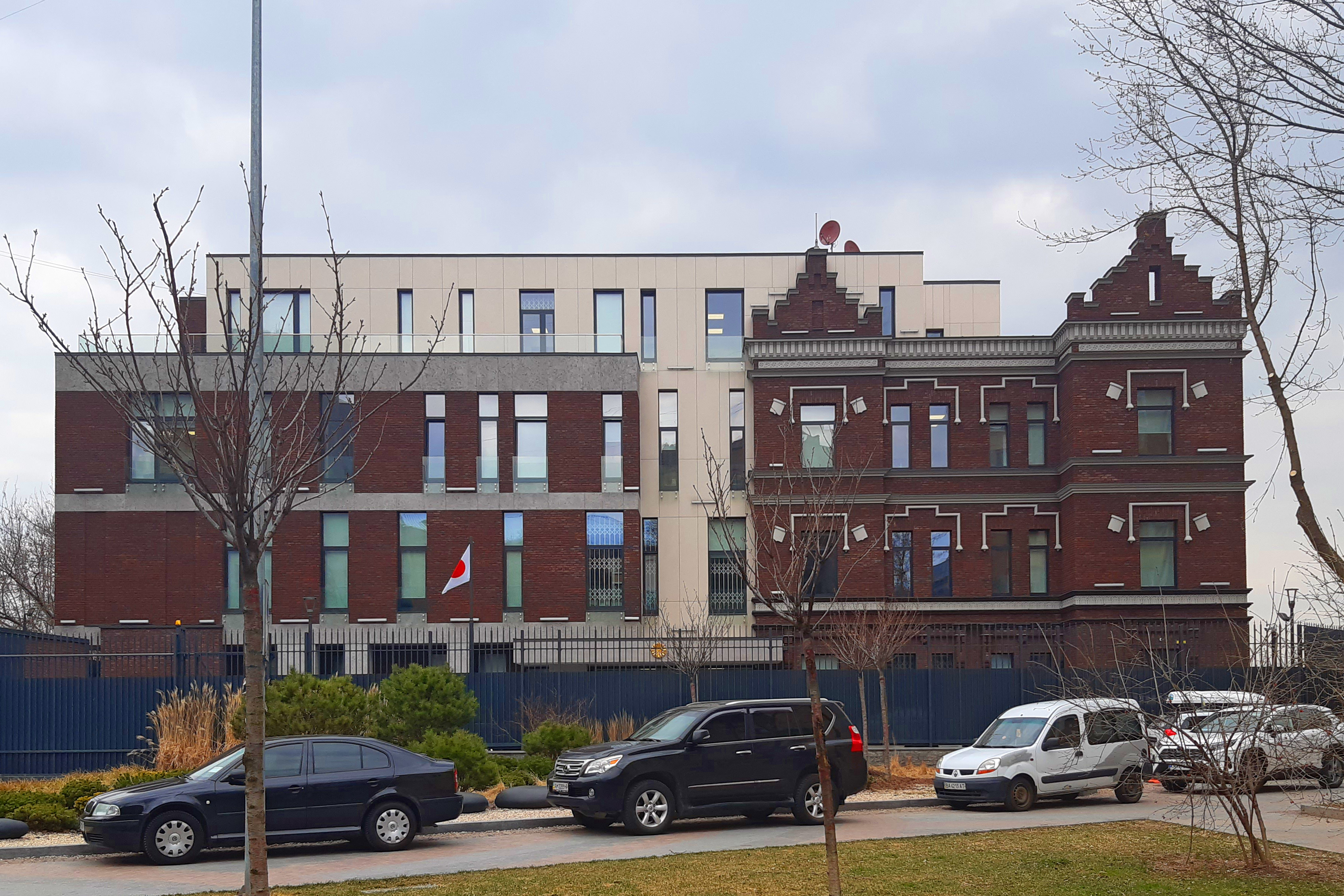
- The Embassy building in Kyiv
- Location: (Ukraine) Kyiv
- Address: Bldg. 4, Museum Lane, Kyiv 01901.
- Ambassador: Kuninori Matsuda
- Website: Embassy of Japan in Ukraine (Ukr.)

The Embassy of Japan in Ukraine (Zai Ukuraina Nihonkoku Taishikan (在ウクライナ日本国大使館), Ukrainian: Посольство Японії в Україні) is located in the Shevchenkivskyi District of Kyiv. It is being headed by an extraordinary and plenipotentiary ambassador.

== History ==
Until January 19, 1993, the Embassy of Japan in Ukraine was a part-time Embassy of Japan in Moscow, Russia. On 14 February 2022, the embassy in Kyiv was temporarily closed with embassy operations relocated to a liaison office in Lviv. This followed a call by the embassy on 11 February for Japanese nationals in Ukraine to leave the country as fears mounted ahead of the Russian invasion of Ukraine. The embassy in Kyiv reopened in October 2022.

== Ambassadors to Ukraine ==
List of Ambassadors of Japan to Ukraine:

1. Edamura Sumio Edamura Sumio (枝村純郎) (June 12, 1992 - April 13, 1993) Office held in Moscow till 19 January 1993.
2. Suezawa Shoji Suezawa Shōji (末沢昌二) (April 13, 1993 - October 1, 1996)
3. Kurokawa Yuji Kurokawa Yūji (黒川祐次) (October 21, 1996 - May 28, 1999)
4. Honda Hitoshi Honda Hitoshi (本田均) (July 21, 1999 - September 1, 2002)
5. Amae Kishichiro Amae Kishichirō (天江喜七郎) (September 20, 2002 - September 30, 2005)
6. Mabuchi Mutsuo Mabuchi Mutsuo (馬渕睦夫) (October 4, 2005 - September 1, 2008)
7. Izawa Tadashi Izawa Tadashi (伊沢正) (September 3, 2008 - August 26, 2011)
8. Sakata Toichi Sakata Tōichi (坂田東一) (September 1, 2011 - August 29, 2014)
9. Sumi Shigeki Sumi Shigeki (角茂樹) (August 29, 2014 - November 26, 2018)
10. Kurai Takashi Kurai Takashi (倉井高志) (December 4, 2018 - August 27, 2021) Inaugurated as of 23 January 2019.
11. Matsuda Kuninori Matsuda Kuninori (松田邦紀) (August 27, 2021 - October 2024)

== See also ==
- Embassy of Ukraine in Japan
