= Band Kurai =

Coordinates: 32°2′26″N 70°54′12″E

Band Kurai Bandeen
- Town and union council
- Interactive map of Band Kurai
- Country: Pakistan
- Province: Khyber Pakhtunkhwa
- District: Paharpur District
- Subdivision: Paharpur
- Time zone: UTC+5 (PST)

Band Kurai is a town and union council of Paharpur District in Khyber Pakhtunkhwa province of Pakistan. It is located at 32°2'26N 70°54'12E and has an altitude of 182 metres (600 feet).
