= Umaibō =

Japanese puffed corn snack

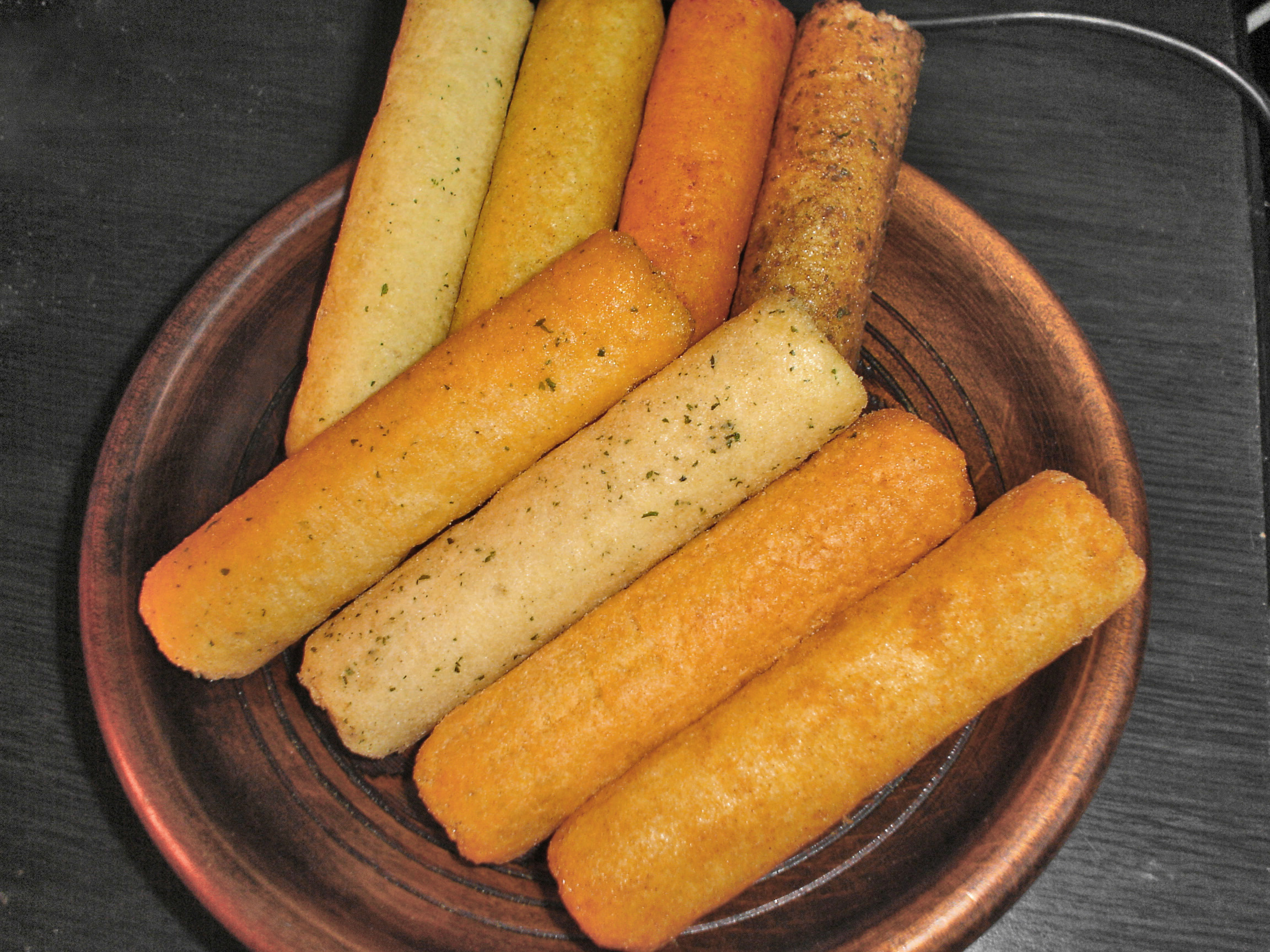
- Umaibō in a variety of flavors
- Type: Snack
- Place of origin: Japan
- Created by: Riska

Umaibō (うまい棒) or "delicious stick" is a small cylindrical puffed corn snack from Japan. It is produced by Riska and sold by Yaokin. There are many flavors of Umaibō available, including savory flavors such as salad, mentaiko, takoyaki, and cheese, and sweet flavors such as cocoa, caramel, and chocolate. New and unusual flavors are routinely introduced and rotated out as limited-time items to keep up interest and create trends. The mascot is a round-headed earless cat, similar to the appearance of Doraemon. This character is considered to be an alien, born on September 13, 1978, on a certain star in a distant universe. With an undecided name, the mascot is sometimes nicknamed Umaemon, a pun on Doraemon, along with other nicknames such as Doyaemon and Umai Boy.

Umaibō is known for its extremely cheap suggested retail price of 10 yen (about 9 US cents in 2022), and this is part of the product's appeal. After staying stably at that price point since the product's launch in 1979, it was announced in January 2022 that the price would increase to 12 yen, the first increase in over forty years. In September 2024 it was announced that prices would be increased further from 12 to 15 yen.

== History ==
Umaibō is a redesigned version of an earlier corn puff snack "Umaimai Bar". The product launched in July 1979 at its famous 10 yen per piece price point, originally aiming at children and young people on a strict budget, and generally being sold in candy stores. It grew in popularity beyond just candy stores, and was soon sold everywhere, including ubiquitous Japanese convenience stores (konbini) and supermarkets. Bag and bulk versions were soon made for sale as well. The revolving flavors gimmick was an early addition, with over 60 different flavors released over the life of the product. The most popular three flavors have remained corn potage, cheese, and mentai.

In 2007, most umaibō were subtly changed to be smaller and lighter, with 1 gram shaved off the product. In the face of supply chain issues exacerbated by the coronavirus pandemic and continued inflation (10 JPY in 1979 is worth around 15 JPY in 2022, a substantial relative decline in value), Yaokin raised the price to 12 yen in January 2022.

In 2024, Yaokin announced that beginning in October of that year, the manufacturer's suggested retail price of umaibō would be increased from 12 to 15 yen, marking the second price increase since 2022. The company cited the increasing costs of ingredients and transportation as the major reasons behind this change. By 2026 the price had increased to ¥16.

Due to its popularity, Yaokin also sells non-snack spin-offs based on the product, often branded with the cute alien mascot. These include lip balms and bath salts, stationery, and a themed pachislot game. In 2017, Yaokin announced that Umaemon would be given a little sister, Umami-chan, who was briefly promoted during 2017.

== In popular culture ==
Umaibō are used as a plot device in the anime and manga series Dagashi Kashi, and are featured in merchandise and promotional material for the franchise.

== Flavors ==
=== Presently circulating ===
- Mentai
- Corn Potage
- Nattō
- Cheese
- Teriyaki Burger
- Salami
- Vegetable Salad
- Chicken Curry
- Tonkatsu Sauce
- Shrimp and Mayonnaise
- Takoyaki
- Chocolate
- Nori
- Beef Tongue
- Sugar Rusk
- Rice Dumplings Zongzi
- Yakitori

==== Only in specific areas ====
- Monja, Apple Pie (Tokyo)
- Honey (Shizuoka)
- Mentaiko (Kyūshū)
- Okonomiyaki (Kansai)
- Kiritanpo (Akita)

=== Discontinued ===
- Caramel Candy
- Cocoa
- Kabayaki
- Saki-ika
- Choikara Panchi
- Crab Chanko
- Omuraisu
- Gyoza
- Chocolate Peanut
- Crab Dumpling
- Mame-rikan (Bean-American)
- Umeboshi Riceball
- Red Lobster
- American Hot Dog
- Marine Beef
- Curry
- Pizza
