= JSDF Overseas Dispatches =

Overseas dispatches of the JSDF

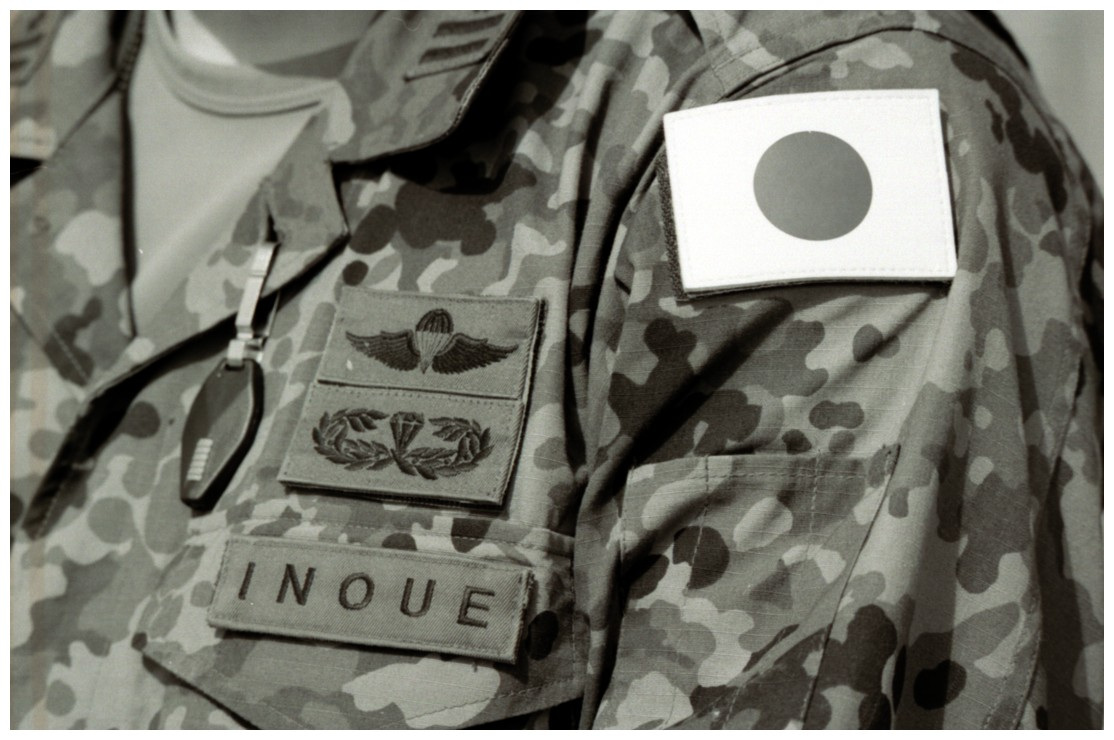
The flag of Japan badge on JSDF uniforms during the Japanese Iraq Reconstruction and Support Group

These are overseas dispatches (Heisei -JSDF deployments outside of Japan) of the Japan Self-Defense Forces (JSDF). Japan sought active international cooperation beyond the framework of previous activities due to the alleviation of tensions after the end of the Cold War in 1989 and the Gulf War that broke out at the beginning of 1991. This began the dispatch of the Self-Defense Forces in the Persian Gulf.

== Law ==
This is the underlying law that triggered the formation. 2006 (Heisei 18) In accordance with the revised Self-Defense Forces Act (Article 3-2 ), which was enacted on December 15, etc., overseas dispatching was upgraded from an incidental mission to an original mission.

- September 1990 - Iran–Iraq War
- 1991 (Heisei 3) January - Gulf War
- December 1991 (Heisei 3) - Dissolution of the Soviet Union.
- 1992 (Heisei 4) -The United Nations Peace Act (International Peace Cooperation Act / PKO Cooperation Act) was enacted. Law on the dispatch of international emergency relief teams (International Emergency Relief Team) .
- 1993 (Heisei 5) - North Korea withdrew from the Treaty on the Non-Proliferation of Nuclear Weapons, Rodong-1 quasi-Medium-range ballistic missile test (North Korea nuclear issue).
- 1994 (Heisei 6) - The revised Self-Defense Forces Act was enacted.
- March 1996 (Heisei 8) -Taiwan Strait Crisis due to the inauguration of President Lee Teng-hui in Taiwan, large-scale exercises of the Chinese People's Liberation Army.
- June 1998 (Heisei 10) -The revised PKO cooperation law was enacted.
- 1998 (Heisei 10) - North Korea shoots Taepodong-1 missile.
- March 1999 - Suspicious ship incident off Noto Peninsula
- May 1999 - Enactment of laws on measures to ensure peace and security in Japan in the event of a circumstance (Neighboring Situation Law) and Defense Guidelines Act (Japan-US New Guideline Law) .
- October 2001 (Heisei 13) - War on terror (War in Afghanistan (2001–2021)) begins.
- 2001 (Heisei 13) -The special measures law against terrorism was enacted.
- December 2001 (Heisei 13) - Battle of Amami-Ōshima
- 2003 (2003) March - Iraq War
- July 2003 - Established the Special Measures Act (Iraq Reconstruction Special Measures Act) concerning the implementation of humanitarian recovery support activities and safety support activities in Iraq .
- July 2006 (Heisei 18) - North Korea, Taepodong-2 and other 7 missile launch experiments.
- 2006 (2006) 10 May - North Korea, again conducted a nuclear test.
- 2006 (2006) 12 May - the Japanese Defense Agency was promoted to the Ministry of Defense (Japan), to the original mission overseas dispatch amendment with the Ministry of Defense Establishment Law, Self-Defense Forces Law established.
- 2007 (2007) January - Defense Agency becomes the Ministry of Defense.
- 2007 (2007) 11 May - Anti-Terrorism Special Measures Law is revoked.
- January 16, 2008 - The Special Measures Law (New Terrorism Special Measures Law) concerning the implementation of supply support activities for anti-terrorism maritime prevention activities was enacted, and supply activities were resumed.
- June 19, 2009 (Heisei 21) - The law on the punishment of piracy and the coping with piracy (the Piracy Action Law) was enacted.
- 2009 (2009) July - Iraq Special Measures Law is revoked.
- January 16, 2010 (Heisei 22) - New Terrorism Special Measures Law expires.
- 2013 (January 2013) - In Amenas hostage crisis
- November 15, 2013 - The revised Self-Defense Forces Act was enacted.
- September 30, 2015 - Enactment of a law (International Peace Support Act) on cooperation support activities for foreign armies, etc. implemented by Japan for the joint international peace coping project . The revised PKO cooperation law was enacted. The revised Peripheral Situation Law (Important Impact Situation Law) was enacted. The revised Self-Defense Force Law was enacted. (Legislation for Peace and Security)

== JSDF Overseas Dispatches ==
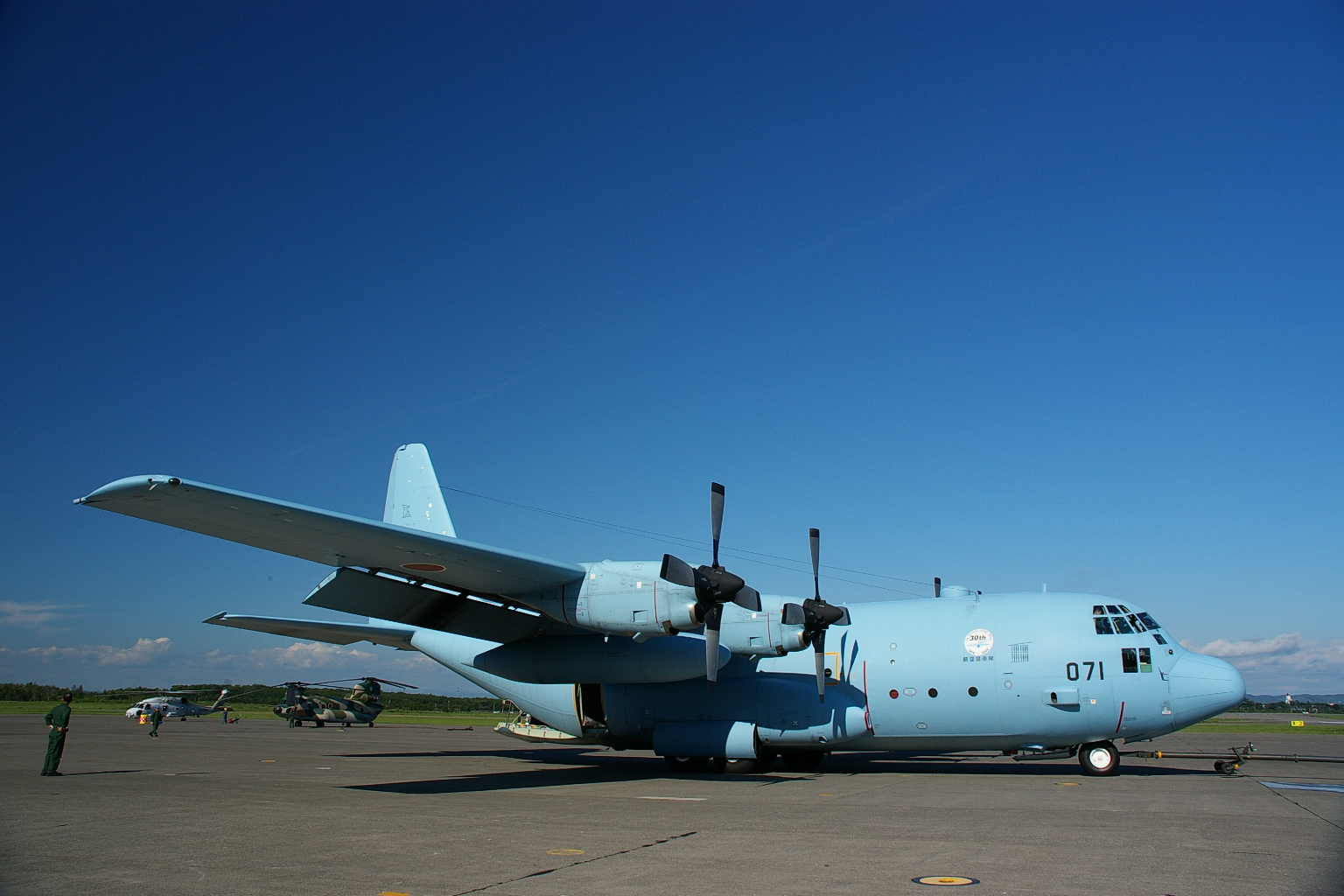
C-130 Iraq dispatch version

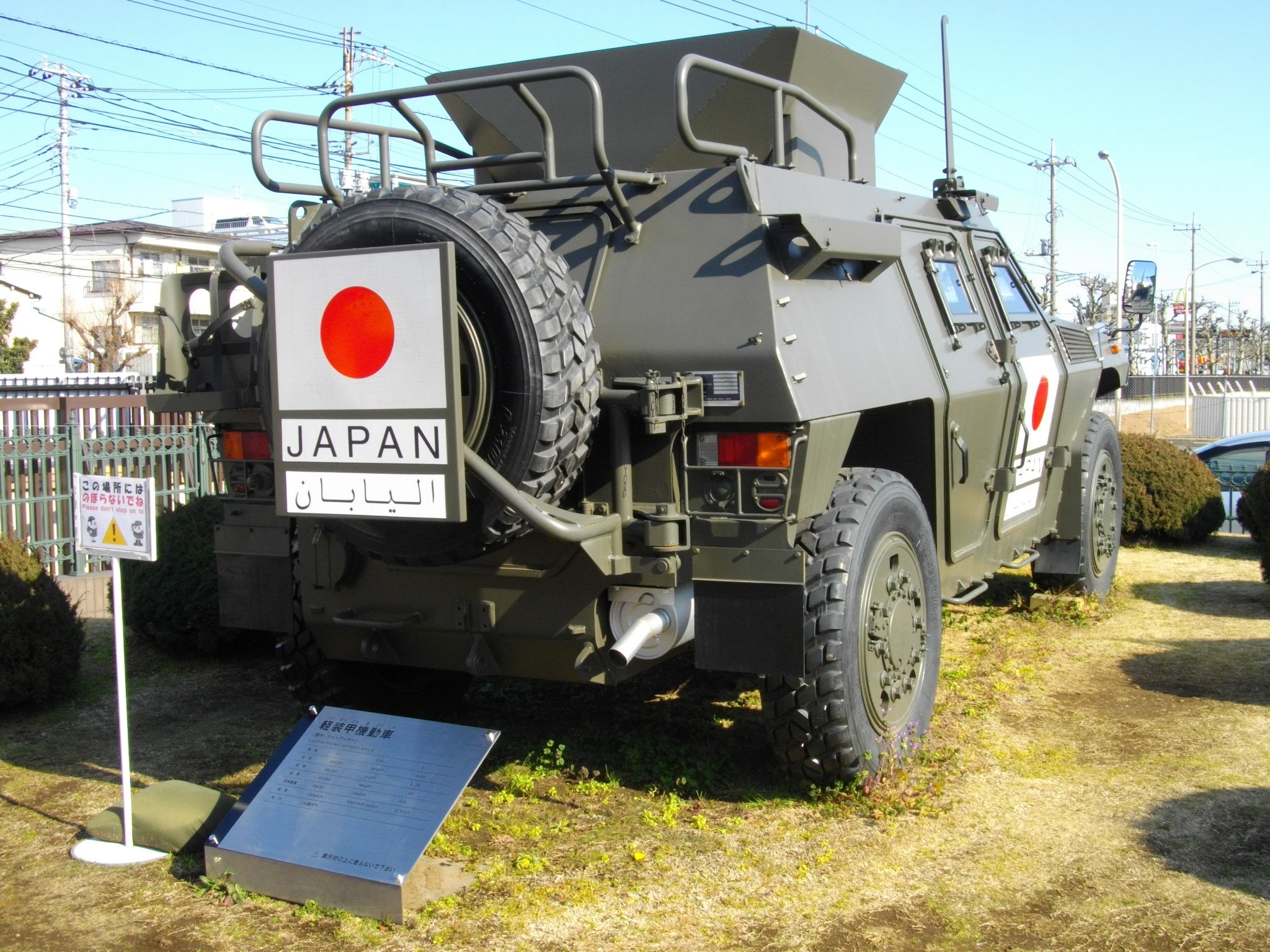
Light armored combat vehicle for dispatch to Iraq

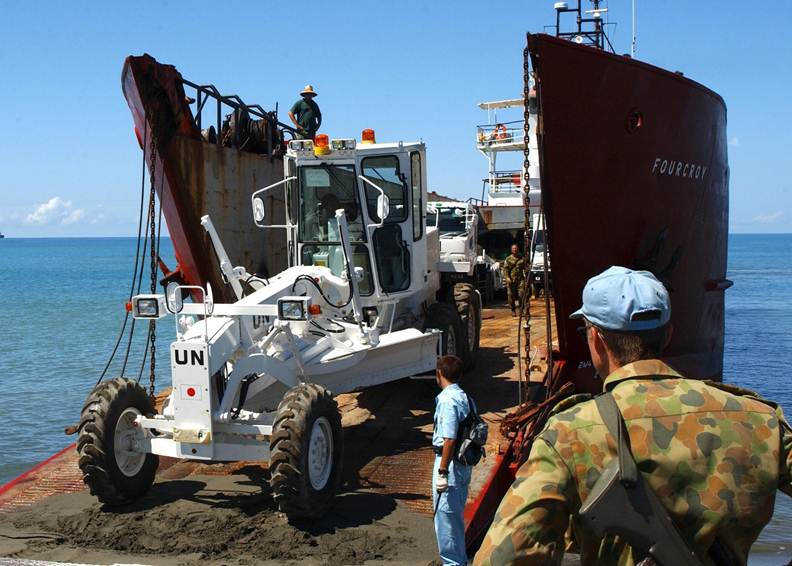
JSDF engineering equipment transported to East Timor

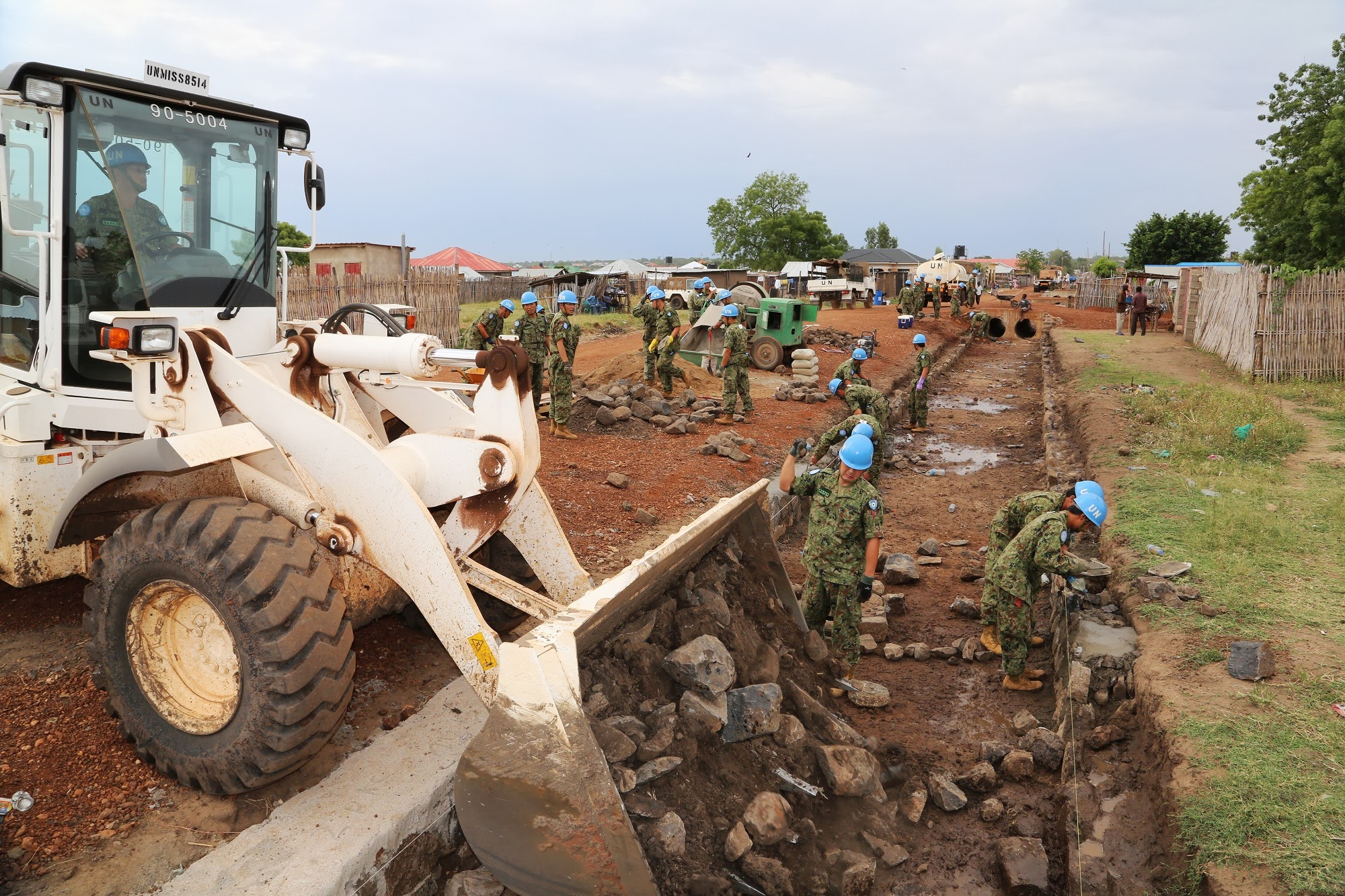
JGSDF develops community roads in South Sudan (April 2013, Nabari district, Juba City)

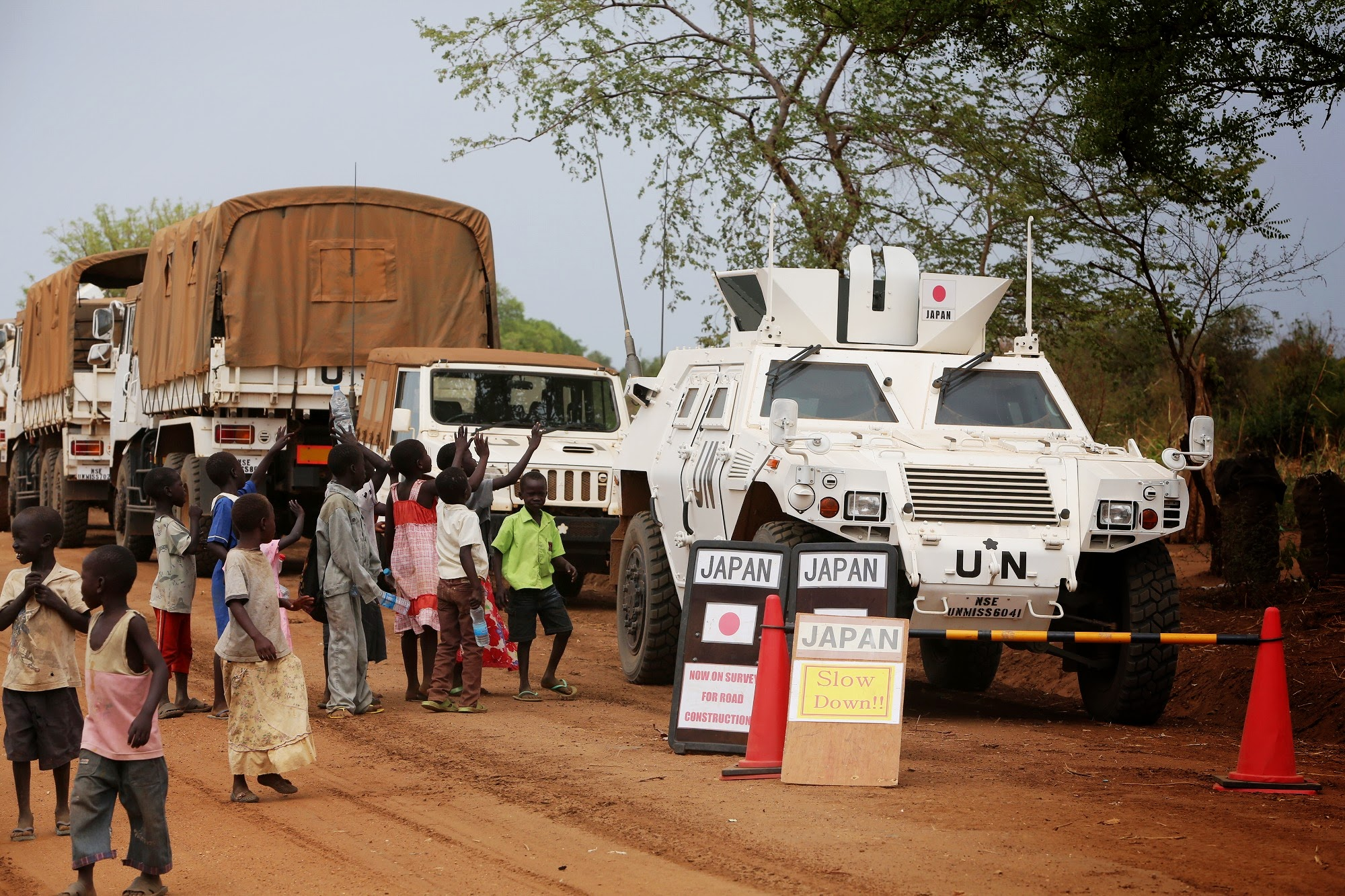
A light armored vehicle in South Sudan's main road

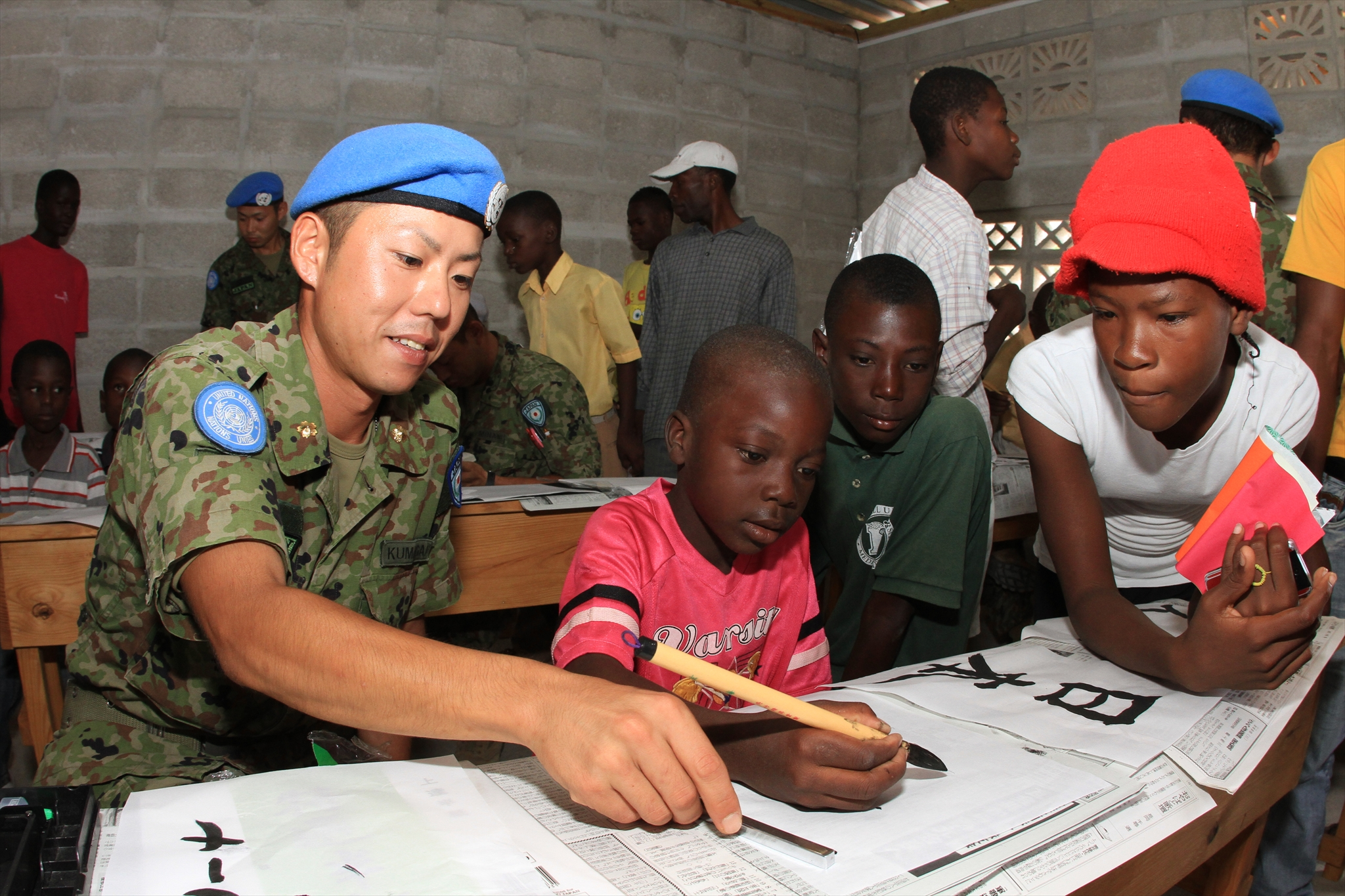
JSDF members conduct cultural exchanges with Haitians

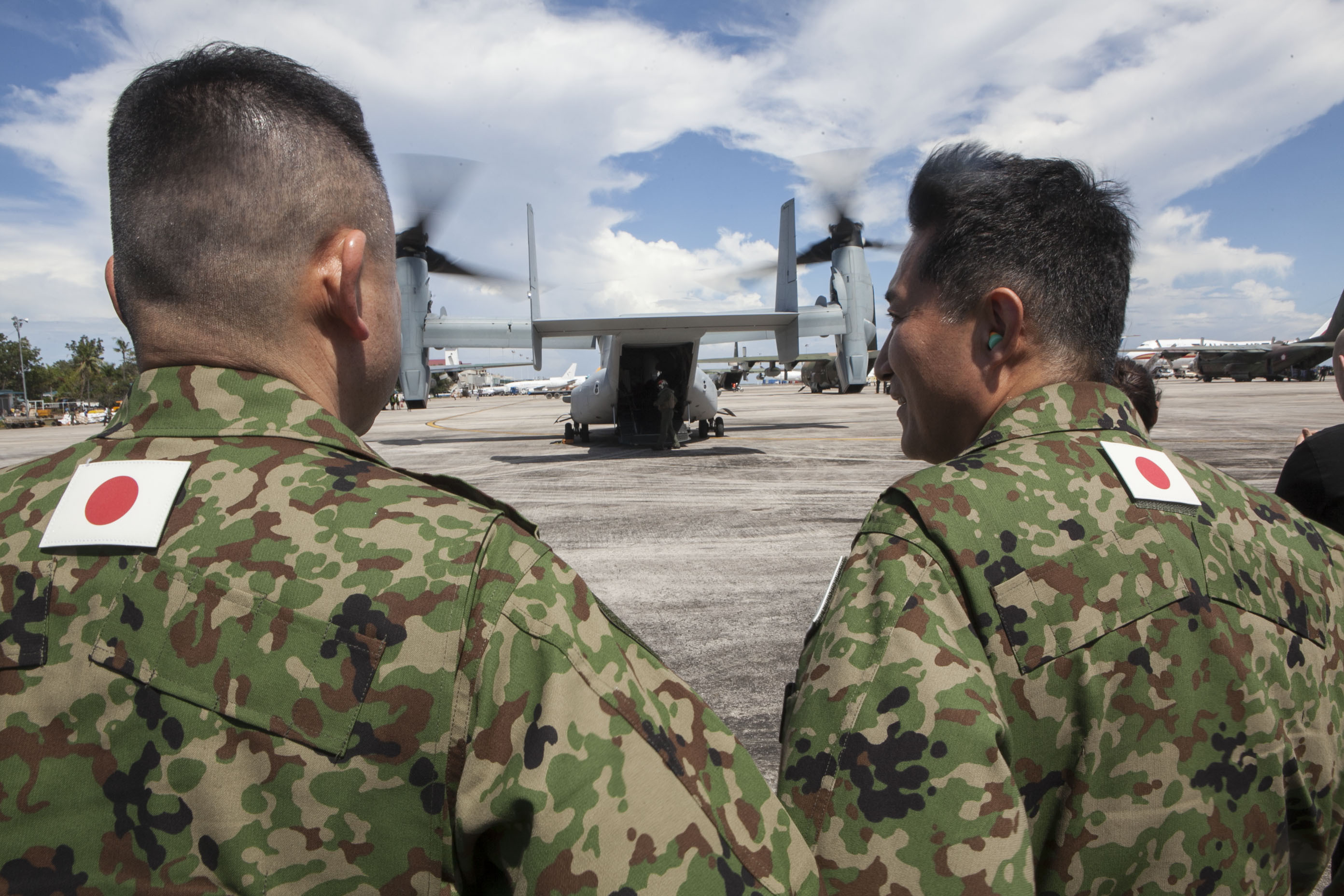
JSDF officers work at Tacloban Air Force Base to support the Philippines during Typhoon Haiyan in 2013.

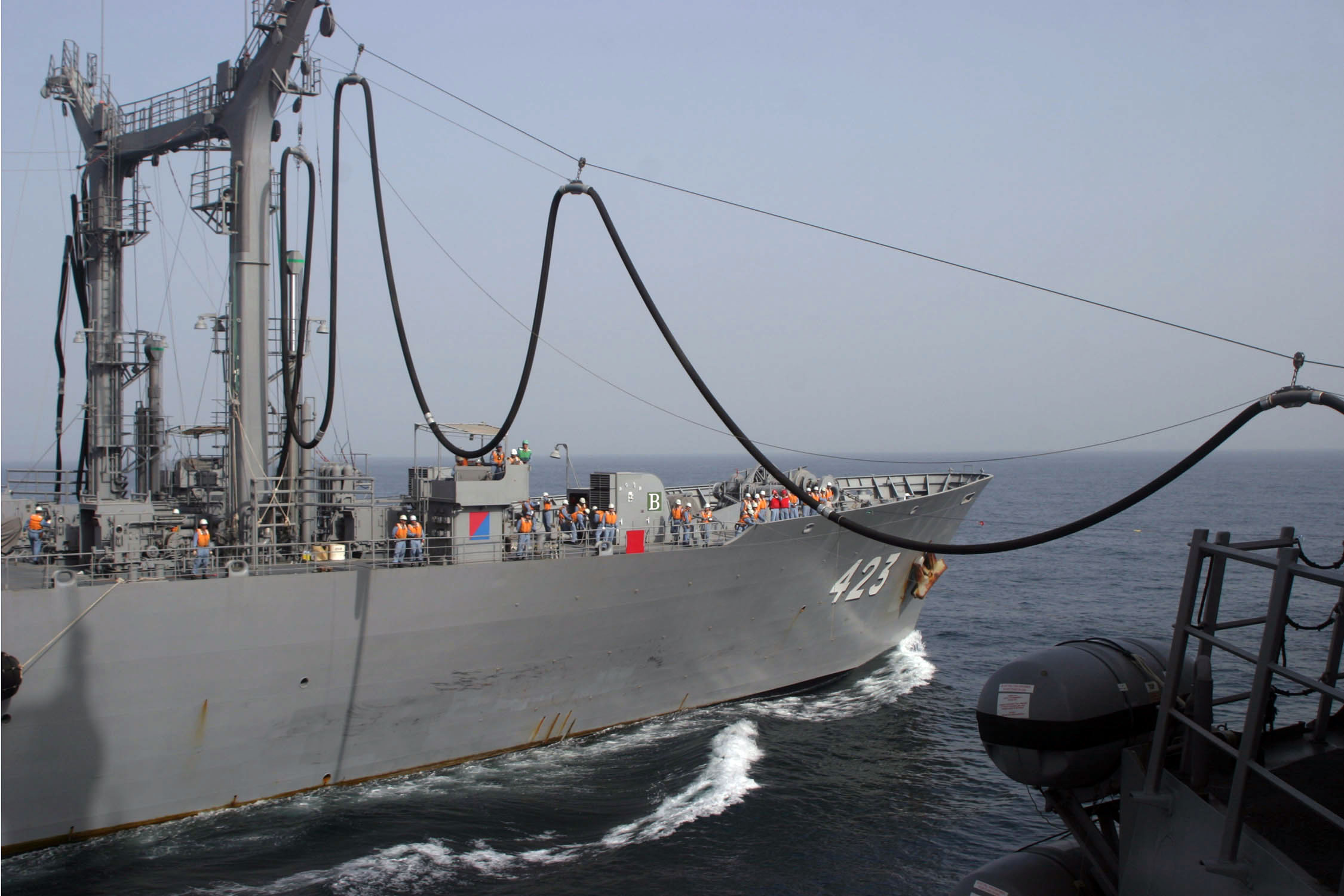
Support in the Indian Ocean 2001-2010 (JMSDF supply ship Tokiwa fueling to USS Decatur)

Since 1991, the Japan Self-Defense Forces have conducted international activities to provide support for peacekeeping missions and disaster relief efforts as well as to help prevent conflict and terrorism.

Deployment	Start date	End date	JSDF numbers	Description
Persian Gulf	April 26, 1991	October 1991	JMSDF 6 minesweeper vessels	6 JMSDF minesweepers removed 34 sea mines in the Persian Gulf to improve the safety of ships.
Cambodia	August 19, 1992	September, 1993	JGSDF 1200	JGSDF truce observers and an engineer unit helped repair damaged bridges and roads in Cambodia. The JASDF transported water and fuel to other peacekeeping units.
Mozambique	May 1993	January 1995	JSDF unit	This was the SDF's second peacekeeping operations. Headquarters staff and a transportation unit were sent to participate in the United Nations Operation in Mozambique.
Rwanda	September 1994	December 1994	JSDF unit and liaison/coordination personnel	This was the first humanitarian relief activity of the JSDF. A JSDF unit and liaison/coordination personnel were dispatched to Zaire (currently Congo) and Kenya for relief operations (supplies, medical, sanitation and water) to Rwandan refugees from the civil war.
Israel Syria Golan Heights	February 1996	Present	JSDF unit and liaison/coordination personnel	JSDF sent staff and a transport unit to the UN Disengagement Observer Force to promote peace in the Golan Heights. Activities include transporting supplies, road repair and snow removal.
Honduras	November 1998	December 1998	JSDF unit and liaison/coordination personnel	After a devastating hurricane, JGSDF units and medical officers provided disaster relief with medical care to prevent epidemics and the JASDF transported equipment from Japan and the United States to Honduras.
Turkey	September 1999	November 1999	JMSDF Three vessels	After a major earthquake, the JSDF dispatched three vessels, including a transport ship, minesweeper tender and a replenishment ship. It included 500 temporary houses as emergency relief supply for earthquake victims.
Timor-Leste	September 1999	February 2000	JASDF Cargo plane	A large inflow of refugees into West Timor were caused by political unrest in East Timor. At the request of the UN High Commissioner for Refugees (UNHCR) the JASDF dispatched a large cargo plane to transport relief supplies from Surabaya, Indonesia to Kuban.
India	February 2001	February 2001	JGSDF unit and JASDF squadron	A JGSDF relief supply unit and JASDF emergency relief air transport squadron transported blankets and tents to areas in Western India that were damaged in a major earthquake. They also instructed local staff on how to use it.
Afghanistan	October 2001	October 2001	JASDF squadron	The JSDF provided tents, blankets, water supply containers and mats to refugees in Islamabad, Afghanistan as part of anti-terrorism activities. These were transported by an JASDF squadron by air.
Indian Ocean	November 2001	November 2007	JMSDF vessels	JMSDF vessels were dispatched to the Indian Ocean under the former Anti-Terrorism Special Measures Law enacted after the terrorism attacks in the United States. The JMSDF vessels provided assistance by supplying fuel and water to foreign naval ships engaged in anti-terrorism activities. The JASDF transported supplies to the United States military forces.
Haiti	2010	2010	JGSDF contingent of troops	The JSDF assisted the United Nations Stabilization Mission in Haiti with a contingent of troops (engineers, bulldozers, heavy machinery). They conducted peacekeeping, reconstructed roads, buildings and removed rubble.
East Timor	February 2002	June 2004	JGSDF 680	The JSDF dispatched personnel and an engineer unit of 680 men and women to the headquarters of the United Nations Transitional Administration in East Timor. They helped repair and maintain roads, bridges and water supply units for local residents.
Iraq	July 2003	August 2003	JASDF cargo plane	The JASDF provided assistance to victims of the War in Iraq by transporting 140 tons of relief supplies between Italy and Jordan with a large cargo plane. This was a request of the World Food Programme (WFP).
Iran	December 2003	January 2004	JASDF 2 cargo planes	After a major earthquake struck Southeast Iran, the JASDF used two large cargo planes to transport 12 tons of emergency relief supplies provided by JICA to Kerman Province.
Iraq	January 4, 2004	2006	JGSDF 9,600	Deployment of 9,600 Ground JSDF personnel to Iraq. The focus was on humanitarian and reconstruction assistance.
Iraq	December 2003	February 2009	JGSDF and JASDF	In order to provide humanitarian and reconstruction assistance and help ensure the stability of Iraq, the JGSDF provided water, medical assistance, school, road repairs and general construction. The JASDF transported supplies between Kuwait and Iraq and played a vital role in the international reconstruction effort.
Thailand	December 2004	January 2005	JMSDF unit	An JMSDF unit helped search for victims after a tsunami struck Thailand following the Sumatra earthquake. The JMSDF transported international emergency aid teams and equipment by air and recovered victims’ bodies from the ocean.
Indonesia	January 2005	March 2005	JGSDF, JMSDF and JASDF	Units from the JGSDF, JMSDF and JASDF were dispatched to Sumatra after a major earthquake and tsunami. This marked the first time that JSDF helicopters were dispatched for international disaster relief activities.
Kamchatka Peninsula	August 2005	August 2005	4 JMSDF vessels	Four JMSDF vessels, including a submarine rescue ship, were dispatched to rescue the crew of a Russian Navy submarine that could not reach the surface near the Kamchatka peninsula. The submarine's crew was rescued by a Royal Navy submarine rescue ship. The Russian government also lauded the rapid response of the JMSDF.
Pakistan	October 2005	December 2005	JASDF cargo plane, 6 JGSDF helicopters	The JASDF used a large cargo plane to transport six JGSDF helicopters to a major earthquake zone in Pakistan. The helicopters transported 824 victims and 131 tons of relief supplies, including medicines and tents.
Indonesia	June 2006	June 2006	Squadron and other personnel	When Yogyakarta was struck by a major earthquake off the coast of Java, the JSDF sent an international emergency medical aid air transport squadron with personnel such as JGSDF medical officers. They provided local medical assistance, medical exams and vaccinations to 5,400 people.
Nepal	March 2007	January 2011	JGSDF personnel	JSDF personnel were dispatched to the United Nations Mission in Nepal as military observers in order to maintain stability in the region after a peace accord that ended armed conflict between the Nepalese Army and Maoist forces. JSDF personnel observed the management of weapons, soldiers in camps and barracks.
Indian Ocean	January 2008	January 2010	JMSDF	The JMSDF mission included supplying water and helicopter and ship fuel to foreign naval ships engaged in anti-terrorism activities in the Indian Ocean. This was permitted after the passing of the Replenishment Support Special Measures Law.
Somalia	March 2009	Present	JGSDF unit and JASDF unit	A JSDF surface and air unit were dispatched to the Gulf of Aden to ensure the safe passage of private-sector vessels. Numerous piracy incidents occurred there. It included a P-3C patrol plane used for warning and surveillance activities and two destroyers to protect civilian commercial ships. JGSDF personnel also provided security for the air unit's facility in Djibouti.
Indonesia	October 2009	October 2009	JSDF unit	After a major earthquake that off Padang Indonesia that caused more than 1,000 deaths, the JSDF sent a medical assistance unit to the area. The three medical officers and other personnel provided emergency medical care to 919 patients.
Haiti	January 2010	February 2010	JGSDF unit	After a major earthquake struck Haiti that killed more than 300,000 people, an JASDF transport plane was dispatched to help transport aid personnel and victims of the disaster. A medical assistance unit from the JGSDF provided disaster relief such as local medical care to 2954 people.
Haiti	February 2010	Present	JGSDF engineer unit	The JSDF dispatched a JGSDF engineer unit for post-quake reconstruction efforts in Haiti. They brought heavy machinery and other equipment to clear rubble, repair roads, perform simple engineering and construction work.
Pakistan	August 2010	October 2010	JSDF unit	Pakistan suffered major flood damage caused by torrential rains. At the request of local Pakistani governments, a joint JSDF rescue unit was dispatched. It consisted of personnel from the JGSDF, JMSDF and JASDF. An JMSDF transport ship, JASDF C130H transport plane and six JGSDF helicopters helped transport 260 tons of relief supplies and 49 aid officials.
Timor-Leste	September 2010	Present	JSDF personnel	At the request of the UN, two JSDF personnel were dispatched as military liaison officers for the United Nations Integrated Mission in East Timor. The JSDF personnel collected information to monitor civic order throughout East Timor to ensure that ceasefire was adhered.
New Zealand	February 2011	March 2011	JSDF unit	Following a major earthquake near Christchurch, the New Zealand government requested help from Japan. The JSDF organized an international disaster relief air transport unit with a rescue team consisting of personnel from the National Police Agency, the Fire and Disaster Management Agency and the Japan Coast Guard. It was one of the first to arrive in the country.
South Sudan	12 December 2016	17 April 2017	JGSDF 12	Ceasefire observers and security 12 personnel participated in peacekeeping operations on the ground in Sudan over the course of two years and 11 months.
Afghanistan	August 2021	September 2021	Central Readiness Regiment	During Fall of Kabul and Kabul airlift in August 2021, the JSDF dispatched JASDF and JGSDF Central Readiness Regiment to evacuate its citizens in Afghanistan
