= Kurai Takashi =

Japanese diplomat

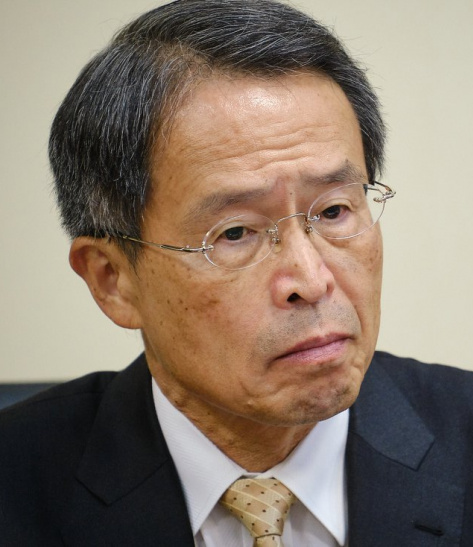
- Born: 1955 (age 70–71)
- Occupation: Diplomat
- Notable work: Ambassador of Japan to Ukraine, Ambassador of Japan to Pakistan, Ambassador of Japan to Russia

Takashi Kurai (倉井高志; 1955, Japan) is a Japanese diplomat. He was ambassador of Japan to Ukraine from 2019 to 2021. Takashi speaks English and Russian.

== Biography ==
Kurai Takashi was born in 1955.

Since 1981 he has been working as a diplomat at the Ministry of Foreign Affairs of Japan.

Since 1984 he has been an employee of the Embassy of Japan in the USSR.

Since 1989 – Deputy Director of the Security Policy Division of the Information and Analysis Bureau

Since 1991 – Deputy Director of the 1st Division of Europe in the Bureau of European Affairs.

Since 1993 – Deputy Director, Director of the Security Policy Department of the Bureau of Foreign Policy.

Since 1995 – Political Adviser of the Embassy of Japan in Russia.

Since 1999 – Director of the Assistance Division in the Bureau of European Affairs.

Since 2001 – Director of the Department of Central and South-Eastern Europe, Bureau of European Affairs

Since 2003 – Director of the 1st Division of the Intelligence and Analysis Service

Since 2005 – Minister of the Embassy of Japan in Russia.

Since 2008 – Minister of the Permanent Mission of Japan to International Organizations in Vienna

Since 2010 – Deputy Director General of the Intelligence and Analysis Service.

Since 2012 – Minister, Deputy Ambassador of Japan to the Republic of Korea.

Since 2014 – Ambassador of Japan to Russia.

Since February 2016 – Ambassador of Japan to Pakistan.

On 4 December 2018, Takashi was appointed by the Government of Japan as Ambassador of Japan to Ukraine. His office in Ukraine started on 23 January 2019. On 11 February 2019, he presented credentials to the President of Ukraine Petro Poroshenko.

On 23 August 2021, he represented Japan on the Crimea Platform.

In August 2021 Kuninori Matsuda succeeded Takashi as Ambassador of Japan to Ukraine. Ambassador Takashi officially completed his diplomatic mission in Ukraine on 7 October 2021.

== Awards and honors ==
- Order of Merit (Ukraine, 22 August 2020) – for significant personal contribution to strengthening the international prestige of Ukraine, development of interstate cooperation, fruitful public activity.
