= Kurai, Khyber Pakhtunkhwa =

Kurai
- Town and union council
- Interactive map of Kurai
- Country: Pakistan
- Province: Khyber-Pakhtunkhwa
- District: Dera Ismail Khan District
- Time zone: UTC+5 (PST)

Kurai is a town and union council in Dera Ismail Khan District of Khyber Pakhtunkhwa. It is located at 31°52′0″N 70°51′0″E and has an altitude of 164 metres (541 feet).
