= Embassy of Ukraine, Tokyo =

Embassy of Ukraine in Japan
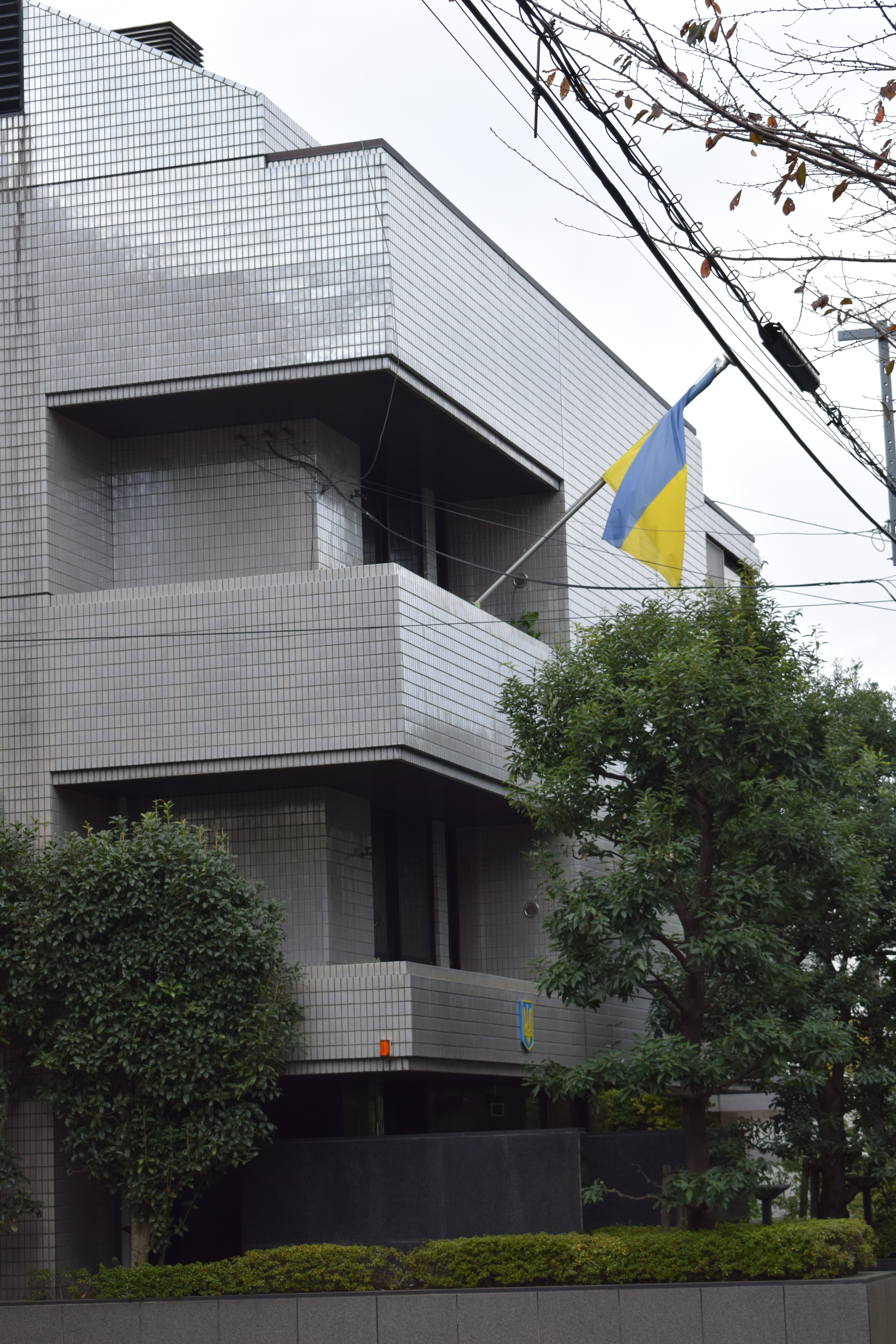
- The Embassy building in Tokyo
- Location: Tokyo, Japan
- Address: Japan, Tokyo 106-0031, Minato, Nishi-Azabu 3-5-31
- Ambassador: Yuriy Lutovinov
- Website: Embassy of Ukraine in Japan

The Embassy of Ukraine in Japan (Ukrainian::Посольство України в Японії, Japanese::在日 ウ ク ラ イ ナ 大使館, IPA: [d͡zai̯nit͡ɕi ukuɾa.ina tai̯ɕi̥kaɴ]) is the official representative office of Ukraine in Japan. Located in the prestigious Minato district of Tokyo, where the embassies of most foreign countries in Japan are. Registered in September 1994. It was opened on March 23, 1995, with the participation of the Minister for Foreign Affairs of Ukraine Hennadiy Udovenko during the official visit of the President of Ukraine Leonid Kuchma to Japan. It is headed by an extraordinary and plenipotentiary ambassador.

== Ambassadors ==
Ambassadors of Ukraine to Japan:

- Mykhailo Dashkevych (January 1995 - October 1999)
- Yurii V. Kostenko (March 2001 - May 2006)
- Volodymyr Makukha (June 2006 - August 2006)
- Mykola Kulinich (September 2006 - January 2013)
- Ihor Kharchenko (January 2013 - April 2020)
- Sergiy Korsunsky (April 2020 - December 2024)
- Yuriy Lutovinov (July 2025 -)

== See also ==
- Japan–Ukraine relations
- List of diplomatic missions of Ukraine
