= List of international presidential trips made by Petro Poroshenko =

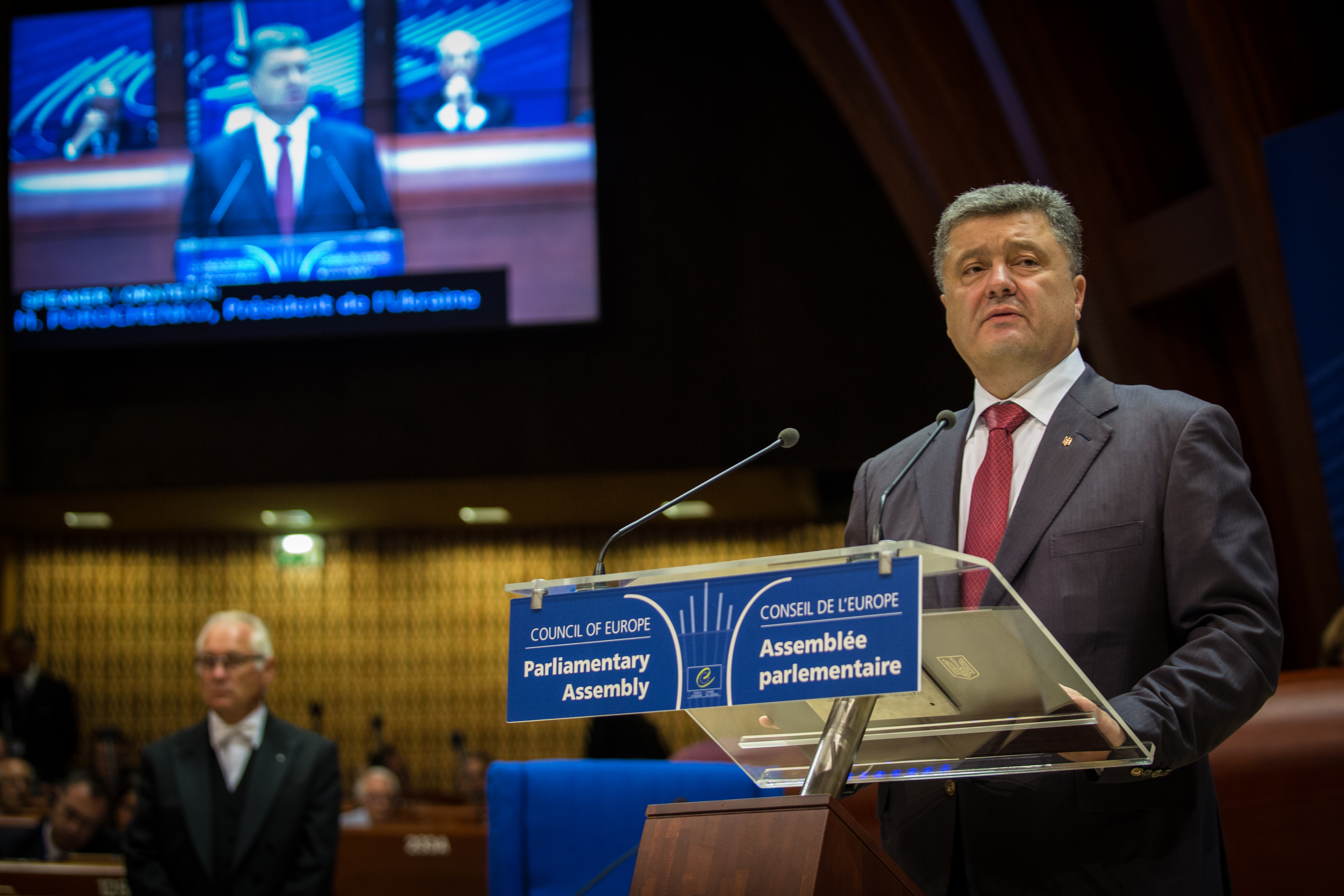
President Petro Poroshenko delivers a speech to the Council of Europe parliamentary assembly in Strasbourg, 26 June 2014.

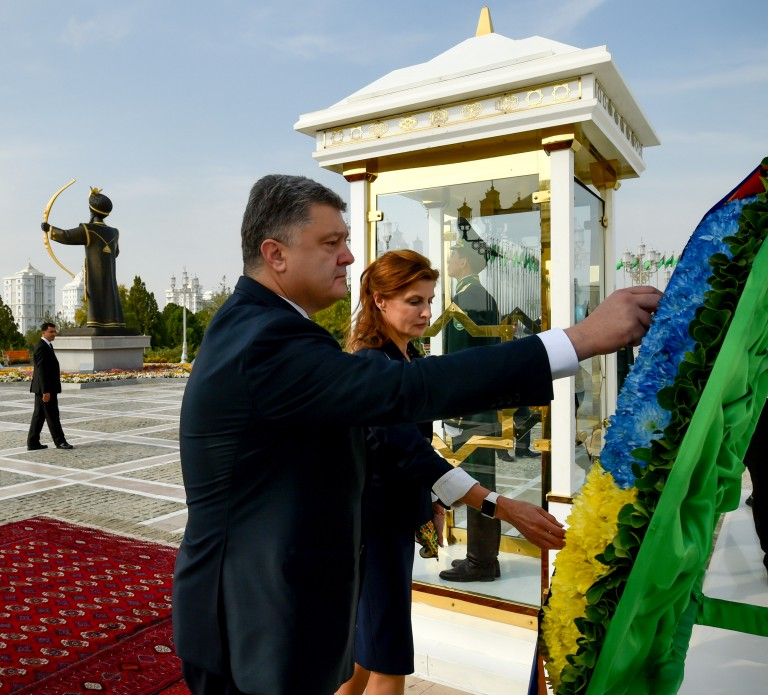
Poroshenko with his wife in Ashgabat.

This is a list of international presidential trips made by Petro Poroshenko, the 5th President of Ukraine. He visited 33 countries during his presidency. Also, Poroshenko made two visits as a president-elect, before his inauguration. On 4 June 2014, Petro Poroshenko traveled to Warsaw to celebrate the 25th anniversary of Poland's liberation. On 6 June 2014, Petro Poroshenko traveled to France as a personal guest of President François Hollande at the ceremonies for the 70th anniversary of D-Day in Bénouville, Normandy.

== Summary of international trips ==
Number of visits	Country	1 visit 2 visits 3 visits 4 visits 5 visits 6 visits 7 or more visits Ukraine
1 visit	Australia, Azerbaijan, Bulgaria, Estonia, Japan, Kazakhstan, Latvia, Moldova, Romania, Singapore, Saudi Arabia, Slovakia, Turkmenistan, United Arab Emirates, United Kingdom, Vatican City	1 visit 2 visits 3 visits 4 visits 5 visits 6 visits 7 or more visits Ukraine
2 visits	Canada, Italy, Israel, Netherlands	1 visit 2 visits 3 visits 4 visits 5 visits 6 visits 7 or more visits Ukraine
3 visits	Switzerland, Lithuania, Turkey	1 visit 2 visits 3 visits 4 visits 5 visits 6 visits 7 or more visits Ukraine
4 visits	Belarus	1 visit 2 visits 3 visits 4 visits 5 visits 6 visits 7 or more visits Ukraine
6 visits	France	1 visit 2 visits 3 visits 4 visits 5 visits 6 visits 7 or more visits Ukraine
7 visits	Belgium, Germany, Poland	1 visit 2 visits 3 visits 4 visits 5 visits 6 visits 7 or more visits Ukraine
9 visits	United States	1 visit 2 visits 3 visits 4 visits 5 visits 6 visits 7 or more visits Ukraine

== 2014 ==
The following international trips were made by President Petro Poroshenko in 2014:

Country	Areas visited	Date(s)	Notes
France	Strasbourg	26 June	President Petro Poroshenko addressed the Parliamentary Assembly of the Council of Europe (PACE).
Belgium	Brussels	27 June	See also: Ukraine–European Union relations A signing ceremony of the Association Agreement with the EU.
Belarus	Minsk	26 August	See also: Belarus–Ukraine relations Consultations in the format EU-Ukraine-"Eurasian Troika" (Russia, Belarus, Kazakhstan).
Belgium	Brussels	30 August	President Petro Poroshenko met with President of the European Commission José Manuel Barroso and President of the European Council Herman Van Rompuy., attended the annual summit of the European People's Party and addressed EU leaders at the special meeting of the European Council.
United Kingdom	Newport, Cardiff	4–5 September	See also: Ukraine–NATO relations NATO summit. President Petro Poroshenko delivered a speech at the meeting of the Alliance's leaders, attended the session of the Ukraine-NATO Commission, took part in a joint press conference with NATO Secretary General Anders Fogh Rasmussen.
Canada	Ottawa	16–17 September	See also: Canada–Ukraine relations President Petro Poroshenko met with Prime Minister of Canada Stephen Harper and Governor General of Canada David Johnston, took part in the joint session of the Parliament of Canada where he delivered a speech.
United States	Washington, D.C.	17–18 September	See also: Ukraine–United States relations President Petro Poroshenko met with President of the United States Barack Obama, US Secretary of State John Kerry, had lunch with Vice President Joe Biden at the Naval Observatory and delivered a speech at the joint meeting of Congress. Also President Petro Poroshenko received a Global Citizen Award from Atlantic Council.
Italy	Milan	16–17 October	ASEM summit. President Petro Poroshenko had a multilateral meeting with Prime Minister of Italy Matteo Renzi, Federal Chancellor of Germany Angela Merkel, President of France François Hollande, Prime Minister of the United Kingdom David Cameron, President of Russia Vladimir Putin, President of the European Council Herman Van Rompuy and President of the European Commission José Manuel Barroso.
Slovakia	Bratislava	16 November	Visegrád Four meeting, celebration of the 25th anniversary of the Velvet Revolution. President Petro Poroshenko had a meeting with President of Poland Bronisław Komorowski, President of Slovakia Andrej Kiska, President of Hungary János Áder and President of the Czech Republic Miloš Zeman.
Moldova	Chișinău, Bălți	20 November	See also: Moldova–Ukraine relations Joint visit with President of Poland Bronisław Komorowski. President Petro Poroshenko met with President of Moldova Nicolae Timofti, Prime Minister of Moldova Iurie Leancă, President of the Moldovan Parliament Igor Corman. Also President Petro Poroshenko visited Bălți and talked with the local community of Ukrainians.
Singapore	Singapore	9 December	President Petro Poroshenko met with President of Singapore Tony Tan Keng Yam and Prime Minister of Singapore Lee Hsien Loong, delivered a speech at the IISS-Asia Fullerton Lecture Series.
Australia	Sydney, Melbourne, Brisbane, Canberra	10–13 December	President Petro Poroshenko met with Prime Minister of Australia Tony Abbott, Governor-General of Australia Sir Peter John Cosgrove, visited the Australian War Memorial and the National Memorial to the Victims of Holodomor. Also President Petro Poroshenko delivered a speech in the Lowy Institute for International Policy.
Poland	Warsaw, Lublin	17–18 December	See also: Poland–Ukraine relations President Petro Poroshenko met with President of Poland Bronisław Komorowski, Speaker of the Polish Senate Bogdan Borusewicz and Marshal of the Sejm Radosław Sikorski, Prime Minister of Poland Ewa Kopacz, delivered a speech at the joint session of the Polish Sejm and Senate.

=== Cancelled visits during 2014 ===
Country	Areas	Date(s)	Event	Reason for cancellation
Brazil	Rio de Janeiro	13 July	2014 FIFA World Cup closing ceremony.	Difficult situation in Ukraine.
Turkey	Ankara	28 August	Inauguration ceremony of Turkey's 12th president, Recep Tayyip Erdogan.	Sharp aggravation of the situation in Donetsk region.

== 2015 ==
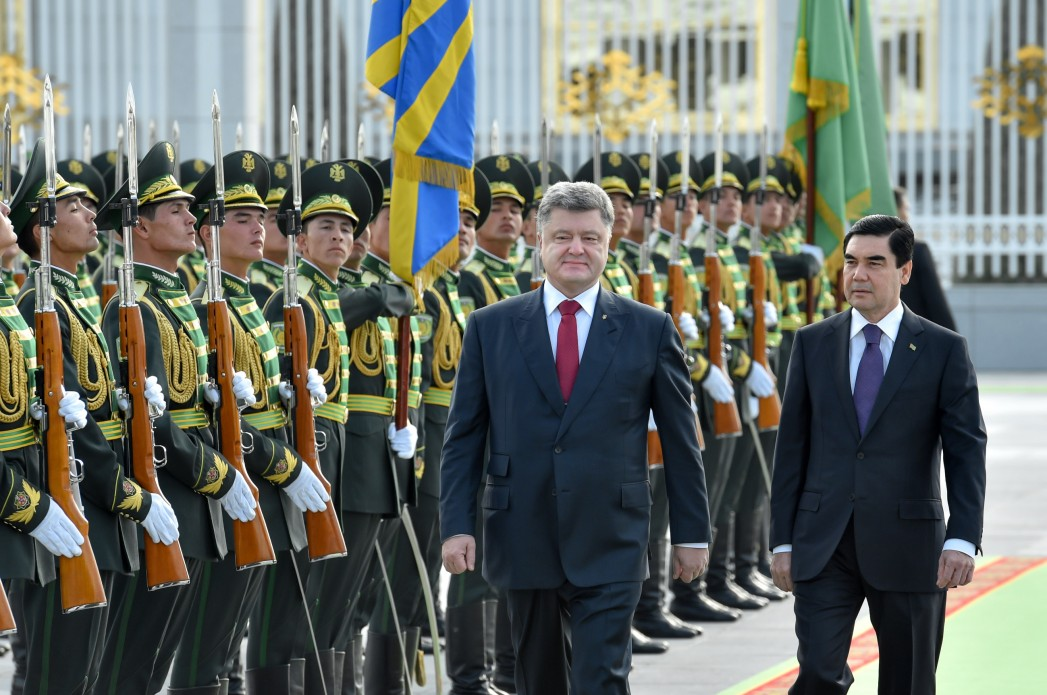
Poroshenko inspecting the Independent Honor Guard Battalion during his visit to Ashgabat in October 2015

The following international trips were made by President Petro Poroshenko in 2015:

Country	Areas visited	Date(s)	Notes
France	Paris	11–12 January	Unity March in Paris
Switzerland	Zürich, Davos	19–21 January	World Economic Forum Annual Meeting. President Poroshenko delivered speeches at the Europa Institute of the University of Zurich and at the panel "The Future of Ukraine" in Davos. The trip was cut short because of the escalation of fighting in eastern Ukraine.
Saudi Arabia	Riyadh	24 January	See also: Saudi Arabia–Ukraine relations President Petro Poroshenko took part in the funeral ceremony of King Abdullah bin Abdulaziz Al Saud.
Poland	Kraków, Oświęcim, Brzezinka	27 January	President Petro Poroshenko took part in the commemorations marking the 70th anniversary of the liberation of Auschwitz.
Germany	Munich	7 February	President Petro Poroshenko arrived to Munich to participate in the annual security conference.
Belarus	Minsk	11–12 February	See also: Minsk Protocol Meeting with Russian President Vladimir Putin, German Chancellor Angela Merkel and French President François Hollande hosted by Belarusian President Alexander Lukashenko.
Belgium	Brussels	12 February	President Petro Poroshenko joined the session of the European Council at the invitation of the President Donald Tusk, held meetings with President of the European Commission Jean-Claude Juncker, Prime Minister of the UK David Cameron.
(United Arab Emirates) UAE	Abu Dhabi	23–24 February	President Petro Poroshenko attended IDEX-2015, met with Prime minister of the UAE Mohammed bin Rashid Al Maktoum.
Germany	Berlin, Drezden	15–16 March	See also: Germany–Ukraine relations President Petro Poroshenko met with Ukrainians in Germany, President of the Bundestag Norbert Lammert, President Joachim Gauck and Chancellor Angela Merkel.
Switzerland	Geneva, Lausanne	21 April	President Petro Poroshenko met with President of International Olympic Committee Thomas Bach, President of International Committee of the Red Cross Peter Maurer.
France	Paris	22 April	President Petro Poroshenko met with President François Hollande, President of the Senate Gérard Larcher, Secretary-General of Organisation for Economic Co-operation and Development José Ángel Gurría.
Poland	Gdańsk	7 May	President Petro Poroshenko met with President of Poland Bronislaw Komorowski and UN Secretary-General Ban Ki-moon, took part in the celebrations commemorating the end of World War II.
Germany	Aachen, Berlin	13–14 May	See also: Germany–Ukraine relations President Petro Poroshenko met with Chancellor of Germany Angela Merkel, President of France François Hollande, President of the European Council Donald Tusk, President of the European Commission Jean-Claude Juncker, other European leaders, attended The Charlemagne Prize award ceremony.
Latvia	Riga	21–22 May	See also: Ukraine–European Union relations President Petro Poroshenko attended the Eastern Partnership biennial summit.
Germany	Berlin	24 August	See also: Minsk Protocol President Petro Poroshenko met with Federal Chancellor of Germany Angela Merkel and President of France François Hollande to discuss implementation of Minsk agreement.
Belgium	Brussels	27 August	President Petro Poroshenko met with President of the European Commission Jean-Claude Juncker, President of the European Council Donald Tusk, Prime Minister of Belgium Charles Michel, High Representative of the Union for Foreign Affairs and Security Policy Federica Mogherini.
United States	New York City	27–29 September	See also: Foreign relations of Ukraine President Petro Poroshenko addressed the United Nations General Assembly during general debates, attended other events both within the UN and beyond, met with various world leaders.
France	Paris	2 October	President of Ukraine Petro Poroshenko, President of Russia Vladimir Putin, Chancellor of Germany Angela Merkel and President of France François Hollande met to discuss implementation of Minsk agreement.
Kazakhstan	Astana	8–9 October	See also: Kazakhstan–Ukraine relations President Petro Poroshenko met with President of Kazakhstan Nursultan Nazarbayev, Prime Minister of Kazakhstan Karim Massimov, participated in the Kazakh-Ukrainian business forum.
Turkmenistan	Ashgabat	28–29 October	President Petro Poroshenko met with President of Turkmenistan Gurbanguly Berdimuhamedow.
Italy	Rome	18–20 November	President Petro Poroshenko met with President of Italy Sergio Mattarella, President of the Council of Ministers of Italy Matteo Renzi, President of the Chamber of Deputies Laura Boldrini. Poroshenko also met with Ukrainian community of Italy.
Vatican City	Vatican City	20 November	An audience with The Pope Francis.
Netherlands	The Hague, Leiden	26–27 November	President Petro Poroshenko met with Prime Minister of the Netherlands Mark Rutte, King of the Netherlands Willem-Alexander, delivered a speech at Leiden University.
France	Le Bourget, Paris	29–30 November	See also: Politics of global warming President Petro Poroshenko attended UN Climate Change Conference, met with several heads of state.
Lithuania	Vilnius	2 December	President Petro Poroshenko met with Lithuanian President Dalia Grybauskaite, Prime Minister Algirdas Butkevičius, opened a bilateral economic forum.
Belgium	Brussels	16–17 December	President Petro Poroshenko met with NATO Secretary General Jens Stoltenberg, President of the European Council Donald Tusk, President of the European Commission Jean-Claude Juncker.
Israel	Jerusalem, Ramat Gan	22–23 December	See also: Israel–Ukraine relations President Petro Poroshenko met with President of Israel Reuven Rivlin, Prime Minister Benjamin Netanyahu, delivered a speech at the Knesset.

=== Cancelled visits during 2015 ===
Country	Areas	Date(s)	Event	Reason for cancellation
Poland	Warsaw	27 May	Meetings with president-elect Andrzej Duda, President Bronisław Komorowski; the final match of the 2014–15 UEFA Europa League.	Both meetings have been postponed until further notice.

== 2016 ==
The following international trips were made by President Petro Poroshenko in 2016:

Country	Areas visited	Date(s)	Notes
Switzerland	Davos	20–22 January	President Petro Poroshenko participated in the World Economic Forum, met with several world leaders.
Germany	Berlin	1 February	See also: Germany–Ukraine relations President Petro Poroshenko met with Chancellor of Germany Angela Merkel to discuss implementation of Minsk agreement.
Germany	Munich	13 February	President Petro Poroshenko arrived to Munich to participate in the annual security conference, met with US Secretary of State John Kerry, Secretary General of NATO Jens Stoltenberg, European leaders.
Turkey	Ankara, Istanbul	9–10 March	See also: Turkey–Ukraine relations President Petro Poroshenko met with President Recep Tayyip Erdoğan during Turkey-Ukraine High Level Strategic Council meeting. Also Poroshenko met with Prime Minister Ahmet Davutoğlu, Ecumenical Patriarchate of Constantinople Bartholomew I.
Belgium	Brussels	17 March	See also: Ukraine–European Union relations President Petro Poroshenko met with President of the European Council Donald Tusk, President of the European Commission Jean-Claude Juncker to discuss the perspectives of EU visa liberalisation for Ukrainian citizens. Also Poroshenko met with Chancellor Angela Merkel and President of France François Hollande, visited the headquarters of the European People's Party.
United States	Washington, D.C.	31 March–1 April	See also: Ukraine–United States relations President Petro Poroshenko attended the Nuclear Security Summit.
Japan	Kyoto, Tokyo, Yokohama	5–7 April	See also: Japan–Ukraine relations President Petro Poroshenko met with Prime Minister of Japan Shinzō Abe, Emperor of Japan Akihito, visited Miraikan Museum, Isogo Thermal power station.
Romania	Bucharest	21 April	See also: Romania–Ukraine relations President Petro Poroshenko met with President of Romania Klaus Iohannis, Prime Minister Dacian Cioloș, Patriarch Daniel of Romania.
Turkey	Istanbul	23 May	See also: Humanitarian aid President Petro Poroshenko attended the United Nations World Humanitarian Summit.
France	Marseille, Paris	21 June	President Petro Poroshenko met with President François Hollande, leaders of French Parliament, attended Euro 2016 match.
Belgium	Brussels	27 June	President Petro Poroshenko met with leaders of European Union.
Bulgaria	Hisarya, Sofia	30 June	See also: Bulgaria-Ukraine relations State visit.
Poland	Warsaw	8–9 July	See also: Ukraine–NATO relations and Poland–Ukraine relations President Petro Poroshenko attended NATO summit, visited Memorial to victims of Volhynia Massacre.
Azerbaijan	Baku	13–14 July	See also: Azerbaijan–Ukraine relations State visit.
Malaysia	Kuala Lumpur	3–5 August	
Indonesia	Jakarta, Yogyakarta	5–7 August	
United States	New York	19–22 September	71st session of the UN General Assembly.
Israel	Jerusalem	30 September	President Petro Poroshenko attended the funeral of former President of Israel Shimon Peres.
Norway	Oslo	8 October	The official state visit.
Germany	Berlin	19–20 October	President of Ukraine Petro Poroshenko, President of Russia Vladimir Putin, Chancellor of Germany Angela Merkel and President of France François Hollande met to discuss implementation of Minsk agreement.
Netherlands Belgium	Maastricht Brussels	20 October	
Slovenia	Ljubljana	8 November	
Sweden	Stockholm	14 November	President Petro Poroshenko met with Prime Minister of Sweden.
Belgium	Brussels	24 November	EU-Ukraine summit.
Poland	Warsaw	2–3 December	Official visit.

== 2017 ==
The following international trips were made by President Petro Poroshenko in 2017:

Country	Areas visited	Date(s)	Notes
Switzerland	Davos	January 17	President Petro Poroshenko participated in the World Economic Forum, met with several world leaders.
Estonia	Tallinn	January 23	Met with President Kersti Kaljulaid.
Finland	Helsinki	January 24	Official Visit.
Belarus	Minsk	April 26	attended a ceremony marking the Chernobyl disaster.
Malta	Valletta	May 16–17	State Visit.
France	Strasbourg	May 17	State Visit.
United States	Washington, D.C.	June 20	Met with President Donald Trump, Vice President Mike Pence, Secretary of State Rex Tillerson and Defense Secretary Jim Mattis.
(Georgia (country)) Georgia	Tbilisi	July 17–19	State Visit.
United States	New York City	September 18–21	Attended the 72nd session of the UN General Assembly.
Canada	Ottawa	September 22–23	Working Visit
France	Strasbourg	October 11	Working Visit
Saudi Arabia	Riyadh	November 1	Official Visit
(United Arab Emirates) UAE	Abu Dhabi	November 2	Working Visit
Belgium	Brussels	November 23	Working Visit
Lithuania	Vilnius	December 8	Working Visit
Portugal	Lisbon	December 18	Official Visit

== 2018 ==
Country	Areas visited	Date(s)	Notes
Switzerland	Davos	January 24	President Petro Poroshenko participated in the World Economic Forum, met with Rex Tillerson.
Austria	Vienna	February 8	Working Visit.
Lithuania	Vilnius	February 16	Working Visit. Attended a parade in honor of the 100th anniversary of the restoration of Lithuanian statehood.
Germany	Munich	February 16–17	Working Visit. Attended the 54th Munich Security Conference.
Kuwait	Kuwait City	March 18–19	State Visit.
Qatar	Doha	March 19–20	State Visit.
Germany	Berlin	April 9–10	Working Visit.
Germany	Berlin	May 9–10	Working Visit.
Spain	Santiago de Compostela, Madrid	June 2–4	Official visit. President Petro Poroshenko met with President of Galicia Alberto Núñez Feijoo, Prime Minister of Spain Pedro Sánchez, President of the Congress of Deputies Ana Pastor Julián and King Felipe VI.
Turkey	Istanbul	June 12	Working Visit
Serbia	Belgrade	July 3	Official Visit
Poland	Sahryń	July 8	Working Visit
Belgium	Brussels	July 9–11	President Petro Poroshenko attended NATO summit
United States	New York City	September 1	Attended the funeral of Senator John McCain
United States	New York City	September 23	Attended the 73rd session of the UN General Assembly.
Belarus	Gomel	October 26	Attended the First Forum of Regions in Gomel.
Turkey	Istanbul	November 3	Official visit
Finland	Helsinki	November 7	Working visit
France	Paris	November 11	Attended the World War I centenary celebrations
Belgium	Brussels	December 12	Working visit

== 2019 ==
Country	Areas visited	Date(s)	Notes
Turkey	Istanbul	January 5	Working visit
Israel	Jerusalem	January 21	Official Visit
Switzerland	Davos	January 23	Participated in the World Economic Forum
Germany	Munich	February 15	Attended the Munich Security Conference.
United States	New York City	February 20	Working visit
Poland	Warsaw	February 22	Working visit
Belgium	Brussels	March 20	Working visit
Germany	Berlin	April 12	Working visit
France	Paris	April 12	Working visit

== Multilateral meetings participated in by Poroshenko ==
Group	Year					
Group	2014	2015	2016	2017	2018	2019
NATO	4–5 September, (United Kingdom) Newport	none	8–9 July, (Poland) Warsaw	25 May, (Belgium) Brussels	11–12 July, (Belgium) Brussels	
ASEM	16–17 October, (Italy) Milan	none	15–16 July, (Mongolia) Ulaanbaatar	none	18–19 October, (Belgium) Brussels	
WEF	24–25 January, (Switzerland) Davos	19–21 January, (Switzerland) Davos	20–23 January, (Switzerland) Davos	17–20 January, (Switzerland) Davos	24 January, (Switzerland) Davos	23 January, (Switzerland) Davos
MSC	31 January – 2 February, (Germany) Munich	7 February, (Germany) Munich	13 February, (Germany) Munich	17–19 February, (Germany) Munich	16–17 February, (Germany) Munich	15 February, (Germany) Munich
NSS	24–25 March, (Netherlands) The Hague	none	31 March–1 April, (United States) Washington, D.C.	none	none	
EaP	none	21–22 May, (Latvia) Riga	none	23 November, (Belgium) Brussels	none	
██ = Did not attend;██ = No meeting held;██ = Future event

== See also ==
- List of international presidential trips made by Viktor Yanukovych, one of his predecessors
- List of international presidential trips made by Volodymyr Zelenskyy, his successor
