= List of international presidential trips made by Volodymyr Zelenskyy =

Since assuming office in May 2019, Volodymyr Zelenskyy has made numerous international trips in his capacity as the president of Ukraine.

== Summary ==
Zelenskyy has made international trips to 52 countries as president of Ukraine. The number of visits per country where Zelenskyy travelled are:

- One: Argentina, Armenia, Bahrain, Bulgaria, Cape Verde, Croatia, Georgia, Hungary, Israel, Montenegro, Jordan, Oman, Philippines, Portugal, Serbia, Syria, Singapore and South Africa
- Two: Albania, Austria, Azerbaijan, Cyprus, Czech Republic, Finland, Greece, Iceland, Japan, Latvia and Slovakia
- Three: Estonia, Moldova, Qatar, Romania and United Arab Emirates
- Four: Denmark and Sweden
- Five: Canada, Ireland, and Spain
- Six: Saudi Arabia and Switzerland
- Seven: Lithuania, the Netherlands, Norway and Vatican City
- Eleven: Turkey
- Twelve: Italy
- Thirteen: Poland
- Fifteen: Belgium, the United Kingdom and the United States
- Eighteen: France
- Nineteen: Germany

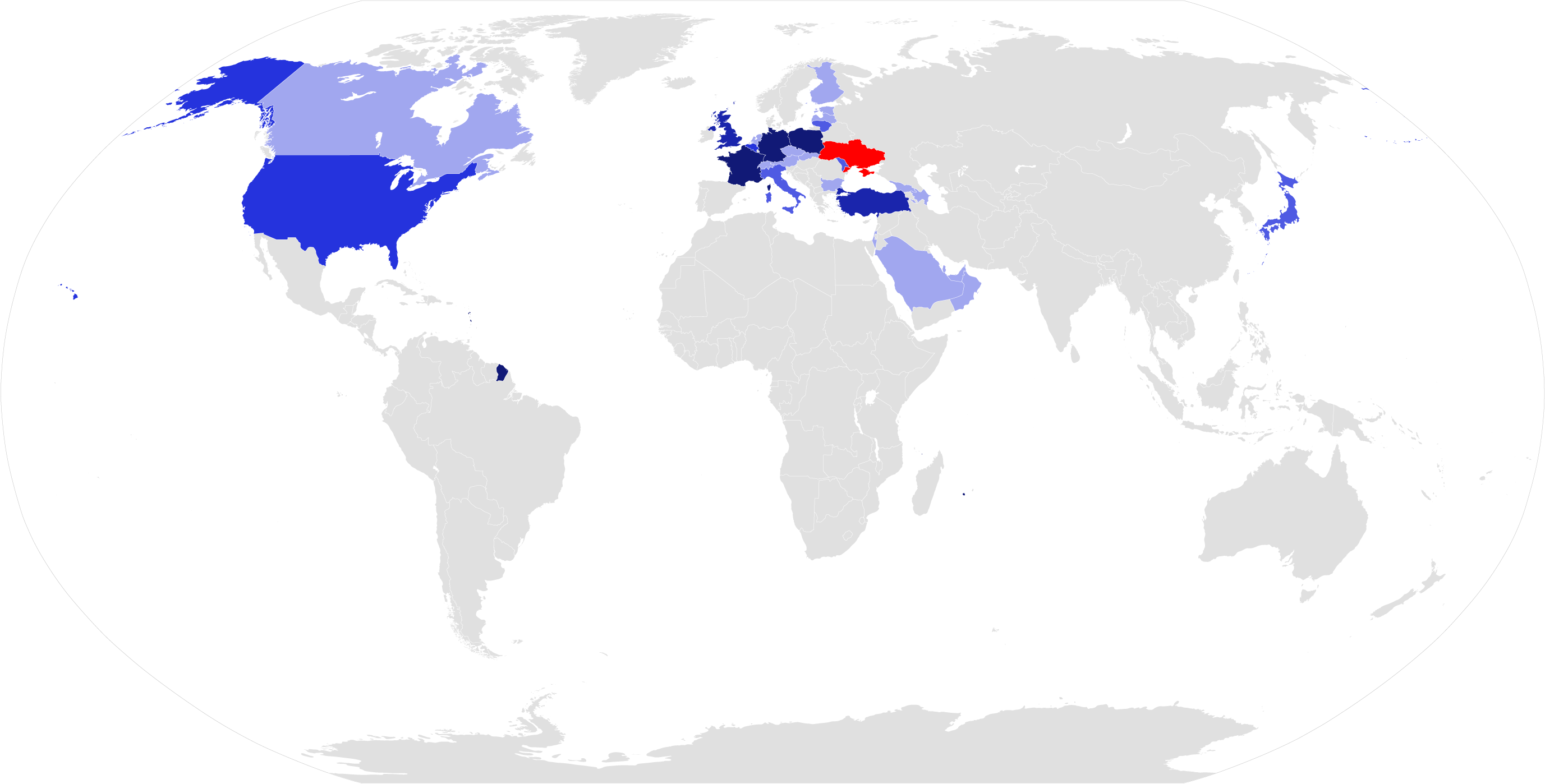
Map of international trips made by Volodymyr Zelenskyy as president, as of July 2023: 1 visit 2 visits 3 visits 4 visits 5+ visits Ukraine

== 2019 ==
| # | Country | Areas visited | Dates | Details | Image |
|---|---|---|---|---|---|
| 1 | Belgium | Brussels | 4–5 June | Working visit. Met with EU and NATO officials. | |
| 2 | France | Paris | 17 June | State visit | |
| 2 | Germany | Berlin | 18 June | State visit | |
| 3 | Canada | Toronto | 1–3 July | Attended the 3rd Ukraine Reform Conference. | |
| 4 | Turkey | Ankara, Istanbul | 7–8 August | State visit | |
| 5 | Poland | Warsaw | 1 September | State visit to commemorate the 80th anniversary of the September campaign. | |
| 6 | United States | New York City | 24–25 September | Attended the 74th session of the UN General Assembly. Met with President Donald Trump. | |
| 7 | Latvia | Riga | 16 October | State visit | |
| 8 | Japan | Tokyo | 21–24 October | State visit. Attended the 2019 enthronement of Emperor Naruhito. Met with Prime Minister Shinzo Abe. Also met with Brazilian president Jair Bolsonaro to discuss increasing trade. | |
| 9 | Estonia | Tallinn | 26 November | State visit | |
| 9 | Lithuania | Vilnius | 27 November | State visit | |
| 10 | France | Paris | 9 December | Attended a Normandy Format meeting with Russian President Vladimir Putin, French President Emmanuel Macron and German Chancellor Angela Merkel. This was the last meeting a Zelenskyy President had with Russian President Putin before the Russian invasion of Ukraine. | |
| 11 | Azerbaijan | Baku | 16–17 December | State visit | |

== 2020 ==
| # | Country | Areas visited | Dates | Details | Image |
|---|---|---|---|---|---|
| 12 | Oman | Muscat | 5–6 January | Working visit | |
| 13 | Switzerland | Davos | 22 January | Attended the World Economic Forum. | |
| 13 | Israel | Jerusalem | 23–24 January | Attended the World Holocaust Forum. | |
| 14 | Poland | Oświęcim | 26–27 January | Working visit | |
| 15 | Italy | Rome | 7 February | State visit | |
| 15 | Vatican City | Rome | 8 February | State visit | |
| 16 | Germany | Munich | 14–15 February | Attended the Munich Security Conference. | |
| 16 | Austria | Vienna | 15–16 September | Official visit | |
| 17 | Slovakia | Bratislava | 24 September | Official visit | |
| 18 | Belgium | Brussels | 6 October | Working visit. Participated in the 22nd Ukraine–EU Summit. | |
| 18 | United Kingdom | London | 7–8 October | Official visit | |
| 19 | Turkey | Istanbul | 16 October | Working visit | |

== 2021 ==
| # | Country | Areas visited | Dates | Details | Image |
|---|---|---|---|---|---|
| 20 | United Arab Emirates | Abu Dhabi | 14–15 February | Working visit | |
| 21 | Qatar | Doha | 5 April | Official visit | |
| 22 | Turkey | Istanbul | 10 April | Official visit | |
| 23 | France | Paris | 16 April | Working visit | |
| 24 | Poland | Warsaw | 3 May | Working visit. Participated in the celebrations marking the 230th anniversary of the 3 May Constitution. | |
| 25 | Lithuania | Vilnius | 6–7 July | Attended the fourth Ukraine Reform Conference. Participated in Statehood Day celebrations. | |
| 26 | Germany | Berlin | 11 July | Working visit | |
| 27 | Georgia | Batumi | 19–20 July | Working visit. Attended the Batumi International Conference | |
| 28 | Moldova | Chișinău | 27 August | Participated in Independence Day celebrations. | |
| 29 | United States | Washington, D.C., Arlington County, San Francisco | 31 August – 1 September | Working visit. Met with President Joe Biden at the White House. Visited the Arlington National Cemetery. | |
| 30 | United States | New York City | 23 September | Addressed the 76th session of the UN General Assembly. | |
| 31 | United Kingdom | Glasgow | 1–2 November | Attended the COP26 Conference. | |
| 32 | Belgium | Brussels | 15 December | Working visit. Attended the sixth Eastern Partnership summit. | |

== 2022 ==
| # | Country | Areas visited | Dates | Details | Image |
|---|---|---|---|---|---|
| 33 | Poland | Wisła | 20 January | Met with President Andrzej Duda at the Wisła Castle. | |
| 34 | Germany | Munich | 19 February | Attended Munich Security Conference. Met with U.S. Vice President Kamala Harris. | |
| 35 | United States | Washington, D.C. | 21–22 December | Main article: 2022 visit by Volodymyr Zelenskyy to the United States First international trip since the beginning of the Russian invasion of Ukraine. Met with President Joe Biden at the White House. Addressed a joint session of the United States Congress. | |
| 35 | Poland | Rzeszów | 22 December | Met with President Andrzej Duda. | |

== 2023 ==
| # | Country | Areas visited | Dates | Details | Image |
|---|---|---|---|---|---|
| 36 | United Kingdom | London, West Lulworth | 8 February | Main article: 2023 visit by Volodymyr Zelenskyy to the United Kingdom Met with Prime Minister Rishi Sunak. Addressed Parliament. Had an audience with King Charles III. Visited Lulworth Camp where he met with Ukrainian troops training there. | |
| 36 | France | Paris | 8–9 February | Unannounced visit. Met with President Emmanuel Macron and German Chancellor Olaf Scholz at the Élysée Palace. | |
| 36 | Belgium | Brussels | 9 February | Addressed the European Parliament at Espace Léopold. Attended a European Council summit with the 27 leaders of the EU member states at the Europa building. | |
| 36 | Poland | Rzeszów | 9 February | Unannounced visit. Met with President Andrzej Duda. | |
| 37 | Poland | Warsaw, Chełm | 5 April | First announced international visit since the invasion. Met with President Andrzej Duda and Prime Minister Mateusz Morawiecki in Warsaw. In Chełm, he met the mayors of Lublin, Przemyśl, Rzeszów and Chełm (Jakub Banaszek). | |
| 38 | Finland | Helsinki | 3 May | Main article: May 2023 visits by Volodymyr Zelenskyy to Europe Attended a summit with President Sauli Niinistö as well as the prime minister of Denmark Mette Frederiksen, prime minister of Iceland Katrín Jakobsdóttir, prime minister of Norway Jonas Gahr Støre and prime minister of Sweden Ulf Kristersson. | |
| 38 | Netherlands | The Hague, Soesterberg | 3–4 May | Main article: May 2023 visits by Volodymyr Zelenskyy to Europe Addressed the States General of the Netherlands in the Hague. Visited the International Criminal Court and met with President Piotr Hofmański. Spoke at the World Forum. Met with King Willem-Alexander at Huis ten Bosch and with Prime Minister Mark Rutte and Belgian Prime Minister Alexander De Croo at the Catshuis. Visited a military base in Soesterberg. | |
| 39 | Italy | Rome | 13 May | Main article: May 2023 visits by Volodymyr Zelenskyy to Europe Met with President Sergio Mattarella at Quirinal Palace and with Prime Minister Giorgia Meloni at the Chigi Palace. | |
| 39 | Vatican City | Rome | 13 May | Main article: May 2023 visits by Volodymyr Zelenskyy to Europe Met with Pope Francis where the two discussed a peace process for the Russo-Ukrainian War over a 40-minute long meeting. | |
| 39 | Germany | Berlin, Aachen | 14 May | Main article: May 2023 visits by Volodymyr Zelenskyy to Europe Met with President Frank-Walter Steinmeier upon arrival, then met with Chancellor Olaf Scholz. Visited Aachen to receive the Charlemagne Prize. Met with European Commission President Ursula von der Leyen. Travelled on a Luftwaffe jet. | |
| 39 | France | Paris | 14 May | Main article: May 2023 visits by Volodymyr Zelenskyy to Europe Met with President Emmanuel Macron at the Élysée Palace. Travelled on a French government aircraft. | |
| 39 | United Kingdom | Ellesborough | 15 May | Main article: May 2023 visits by Volodymyr Zelenskyy to Europe Met with Prime Minister Rishi Sunak at Chequers, the country house of British prime ministers. | |
| 40 | Saudi Arabia | Jeddah | 19 May | Attended the 2023 AL summit and met with Crown Prince Mohammed bin Salman. Travelled on a French government aircraft. | |
| 40 | Japan | Hiroshima | 20 May | Attended the 49th G7 summit as an invited guest. Travelled on a French government aircraft. | |
| 41 | Moldova | Bulboaca | 1 June | Attended the 2nd European Political Community Summit at the Mimi Castle. Met separately with President Maia Sandu. | |
| 42 | Bulgaria | Sofia | 6 July | Met with Prime Minister Nikolai Denkov and President Rumen Radev. | |
| 42 | Czech Republic | Prague | 6–7 July | Met with President Petr Pavel at the Prague Castle. | |
| 42 | Slovakia | Bratislava | 7 July | Met with president Zuzana Čaputová. | |
| 42 | Turkey | Istanbul | 7–8 July | Met with President Recep Tayyip Erdoğan at Vahdettin Pavilion. Attended a memorial service at the St. George's Cathedral and met with Bartholomew I, the Ecumenical Patriarch of Constantinople. Brought five Ukrainian commanders held in Turkey back to Ukraine. | |
| 43 | Lithuania | Vilnius | 11–12 July | Attended the 2023 Vilnius summit as an invited guest and met with the various leaders of NATO member states. Travelled on a Polish government aircraft. | |
| 44 | Sweden | Nyköping, Harpsund, Södermanland | 19–20 August | Arrived via Skavsta Airport. Met at Harpsund with Prime Minister Ulf Kristersson and members of the Swedish government, Speaker of the Riksdag Andreas Norlén, Supreme Commander Micael Bydén and leaders of the Riksdag parties. King Carl XVI Gustaf and Queen Silvia received Zelenskyy at Stenhammar Palace. The next day, a Swedish government aircraft carried Zelenskyy from Skavsta Airport to Eindhoven, Netherlands. | |
| 44 | Netherlands | Eindhoven | 20 August | Met with Prime Minister Mark Rutte at Eindhoven Air Base. | |
| 44 | Denmark | Vojens, Copenhagen | 20–21 August | Crown Princess Mary, Prime Minister Mette Frederiksen, Defence Minister Jakob Ellemann-Jensen, and Foreign Minister Lars Løkke Rasmussen received Zelenskyy upon arrival at Vojens Airport. He visited the Fighter Wing Skrydstrup air base, addressed the Folketing, and met with Queen Margrethe II, Crown Prince Frederik, and Crown Princess Mary at Christiansborg Palace. | |
| 44 | Greece | Athens | 21 August | Met with Prime Minister Kyriakos Mitsotakis at the Maximos Mansion. | |
| 45 | United States | New York City, Washington, D.C. | 18–22 September | Attended the 78th session of the UN General Assembly. Met with President of South Africa Cyril Ramaphosa, President of Kenya William Ruto, President of the European CouncilCharles Michel, United Nations secretary-general António Guterres, Prime Minister of Albania Edi Rama, President of Chile Gabriel Boric, Prime Minister of Israel Benjamin Netanyahu, President of the European Commission Ursula von der Leyen, President of Romania Klaus Iohannis, Chancellor of Germany Olaf Scholz and President of Brazil Luiz Inácio Lula da Silva. Met with President Joe Biden at the White House. | |
| 45 | Canada | Ottawa, Toronto | 22 September | Met with Prime Minister Justin Trudeau and Governor General Mary Simon and addressed Parliament. | |
| 45 | Poland | Lublin | 23 September | Presented state awards to two Poles, one journalist and one volunteer medic, as well as thanking the entire Polish nation for their support of Ukraine. | |
| 46 | Spain | Granada | 6 October | Attended the 3rd European Political Community Summit. | |
| 47 | Romania | Bucharest | 10 October | Met with President Klaus Iohannis, Prime Minister Marcel Ciolacu, Senate President Nicolae Ciucă, and Acting President of the Chamber of Deputies President Alfred Simonis. Zelenskyy was initially scheduled to address the Parliament, but it was cancelled after some lawmakers expressed Russian support over the war. | |
| 48 | Belgium | Brussels | 11 October | Visited the NATO headquarters. | |
| 49 | Cape Verde | Sal | 9 December | Met with Prime Minister Ulisses Correia e Silva at Amílcar Cabral International Airport en route to Argentina. | |
| 49 | Argentina | Buenos Aires | 10 December | Attended with President of Chile Gabriel Boric, President of Armenia Vahagn Khachaturyan, Prime Minister of Hungary Viktor Orbán, President of Uruguay Luis Lacalle Pou, President of Paraguay Santiago Peña and President of Ecuador Daniel Noboa the inauguration of Javier Milei as President. First and currently only trip to Latin America as president. | |
| 49 | United States | Washington, D.C. | 11–12 December | Met with President Joe Biden at the White House. Met with several members of the United States Congress, including with House Speaker Mike Johnson separately. | |
| 50 | Norway | Oslo | 13 December | Met with Prime Minister Jonas Gahr Støre, Finnish PresidentSauli Niinistö, Prime Minister of Iceland Katrín Jakobsdóttir, Danish Prime Minister Mette Frederiksen, and Swedish Prime Minister Ulf Kristersson at the second Nordic–Ukrainian summit. King Harald V received Zelenskyy in an audience at the Royal Palace, together with Queen Sonja, Crown Prince Haakon and Crown Princess Mette-Marit. | |
| 50 | Germany | Wiesbaden | 14 December | Visited the headquarters of the United States Army Europe and Africa. | |

== 2024 ==
| # | Country | Areas visited | Dates | Details | Image |
|---|---|---|---|---|---|
| 51 | Lithuania | Vilnius | 10 January | Unannounced visit. Met with President Gitanas Nausėda, Foreign Minister Gabrielius Landsbergis, and Prime Minister Ingrida Šimonytė at the Presidential Palace. Delivered a speech at Daukanto Square. | |
| 51 | Estonia | Tallinn | 11 January | Unannounced visit. Met with President Alar Karis at Kadriorg Palace and Prime Minister Kaja Kallas at the Stenbock House. Zelenskyy also addressed the Estonian parliament Riigikogu. | |
| 51 | Latvia | Riga | 11 January | Unannounced visit. Met with President Edgars Rinkēvičs at the Riga Castle and with Speaker of the Saeima Daiga Mieriņa and Prime Minister Evika Siliņa at the Saeima House. | |
| 52 | Switzerland | Bern, Davos | 15–16 January | Met with President Viola Amherd in Bern to initiate preparations for the Ukraine peace summit to be held in Switzerland later that year. Addressed the World Economic Forum in Davos. | |
| 53 | Germany | Berlin, Munich | 16 February | Met with Chancellor Olaf Scholz in Berlin to sign bilateral security agreements between Germany and Ukraine. Also participated in the 60th Munich Security Conference. On the sidelines of the conference, he met with President of Guatemala Bernardo Arévalo, U.S. Vice President Kamala Harris, and some members of U.S. Congress. | |
| 53 | France | Paris | 16 February | Met with President Emmanuel Macron to sign bilateral security agreements between France and Ukraine. | |
| 54 | Saudi Arabia | Riyadh | 27 February | Met with Crown Prince Mohammed bin Salman to push for a peace plan and to discuss the return of prisoners of war from Russia. | |
| 54 | Albania | Tirana | 28 February | Met with Prime Minister Edi Rama to encourage further support from southeastern European countries. | |
| 55 | Turkey | Istanbul | 8 March | Met with President Recep Tayyip Erdoğan to discuss the Peace Formula, the organization of a peace conference, the safety of shipping in the Black Sea following Russia's withdrawal from the Black Sea Grain Initiative, global food stability amid the worldwide food crises, as well as the release of Ukrainian captives and political prisoners held by Russia. | |
| 56 | Lithuania | Vilnius | 11 April | Met with President Gitanas Nausėda and with leaders from Central and Eastern Europe, aiming to strengthen support for Ukraine. Also participated in the Three Seas Summit. | |
| 57 | Spain | Madrid | 27 May | Met with Prime Minister Pedro Sanchez and signed a bilateral security agreement with Spain that allocates €1 billion (US$1.1 billion) of military aid to Ukraine in 2024 and more than $5 billion by 2027. Later met with King Felipe VI. | |
| 57 | Belgium | Brussels, Steenokkerzeel | 28 May | Met with Prime Minister Alexander De Croo and signed a bilateral agreement on security cooperation and long-term support. For the first time, such a security agreement contained a specific number of military aircraft to be provided to Ukraine – 30 F-16s by 2028. The 10-year agreement also included cooperating with Belgium on intelligence, cybersecurity, countering disinformation and the defense industry. Also visited the Melsbroek Air Base. | |
| 57 | Portugal | Lisbon | 28 May | Met with Prime Minister Luis Montenegro and President Marcelo Rebelo de Sousa to sign a bilateral security agreement that encompasses political, military, economic, trade, and scientific cooperation, with provisions for potential extension beyond the initial 10-year term. | |
| 58 | Sweden | Stockholm | 31 May | Attended the third Nordic–Ukrainian summit with Prime Minister Ulf Kristersson and other Nordic leaders. Held a separate bilateral meeting with Prime Minister Kristersson and signed a security agreement between Sweden and Ukraine. Also met with King Carl XVI Gustaf and Queen Silvia at the Royal Palace. | |
| 58 | Singapore | Singapore | 1 June | Unannounced visit. Addressed the Shangri-La Dialogue conference organized by the International Institute of Strategic Studies. | |
| 58 | Philippines | Manila | 2–3 June | Unannounced visit. Met with President Bongbong Marcos at Malacañang Palace. Sat down for an interview with Mariz Umali. Zelenskyy became the first Ukrainian president to visit the Philippines. | |
| 59 | Qatar | Doha | 5 June | Met with Emir Tamim bin Hamad Al Thani. | |
| 59 | France | Normandy, Paris | 6–7 June | Attended the memorial ceremonies commemorating the 80th anniversary of the Normandy landings. Addressed the French Parliament and met with President Emmanuel Macron at the Élysée Palace. | |
| 60 | Germany | Berlin, Sanitz | 11 June | Met with President Frank-Walter Steinmeier and Chancellor Olaf Scholz. Spoke at the Ukraine Recovery Conference. Addressed the Bundestag. Inspected the MIM-104 Patriot surface-to-air missile defence system to be given to Ukraine by the Bundeswehr. | |
| 60 | Saudi Arabia | Jeddah | 12 June | Unannounced visit. Met with Crown Prince Mohammed bin Salman. | |
| 60 | Italy | Fasano | 13–15 June | Attended the 50th G7 summit as an invited guest. Met with U.S. President Joe Biden to sign a 10-year bilateral security agreement. Met with Japanese Prime Minister Fumio Kishida to sign a bilateral security and reconstruction accord. Also met with Canadian Prime Minister Justin Trudeau. | |
| 60 | Switzerland | Nidwalden | 15–16 June | Attended the Ukraine peace summit at the Bürgenstock Resort. | |
| 61 | Belgium | Brussels | 27 June | Signed bilateral security agreements with Estonia, Lithuania and European Union. | |
| 62 | Poland | Warsaw | 8 July | Met with Prime Minister Donald Tusk to sign a security agreement between Poland and Ukraine. | |
| 62 | United States | Washington, D.C. | 9–11 July | Attended the 2024 Washington summit as an invited guest and met with the various leaders of NATO member states. | |
| 62 | Ireland | Shannon | 12–13 July | Met with Taoiseach Simon Harris at Shannon Airport and attended a bilateral meeting. | |
| 63 | United Kingdom | Woodstock | 18 July | Attended the 4th EPC Summit in Woodstock. Met with Prime Minister Keir Starmer. | |
| 64 | United States | Washington, D.C., New York City | 23–29 September | Attended the 79th United Nations General Assembly. Met with President Joe Biden and Vice President Kamala Harris at the White House. Met with former president Donald Trump in the Trump Tower in New York City. | |
| 65 | Croatia | Dubrovnik | 9 October | Addressed the third Ukraine-South East Europe summit. | |
| 65 | United Kingdom | London | 10 October | Met with Prime Minister Keir Starmer and Secretary General of NATO Mark Rutte. | |
| 65 | France | Paris | 10 October | Met with President Emmanuel Macron. | |
| 65 | Italy | Rome | 10 October | Met with Prime Minister Giorgia Meloni. | |
| 65 | Vatican City | Rome | 10 October | Met with Pope Francis. | |
| 65 | Germany | Berlin | 11 October | Met with Chancellor Olaf Scholz and held talks on a 'victory plan' for Ukraine. | |
| 66 | Iceland | Reykjavík | 28–29 October | Took part in the fourth Nordic-Ukrainian Summit. Met with the prime ministers of the Nordic Countries. | |
| 67 | Hungary | Budapest | 7 November | Attended the 5th European Political Community Summit in Budapest. Met with UK Prime Minister Keir Starmer, French President Emmanuel Macron, newly elected NATO Secretary General Mark Rutte and Moldovan President Maia Sandu among others. | |
| 68 | France | Paris | 7–8 December | Attended the Reopening of Notre-Dame de Paris in Paris. Held talks with President Emmanuel Macron and US president-elect Donald Trump. | |
| 69 | Belgium | Brussels | 18-19 December | Attended an EU summit and met with Prime minister of Belgium Bart De Wever among others. | |

== 2025 ==
| # | Country | Areas visited | Dates | Details | Image |
|---|---|---|---|---|---|
| 70 | Germany | Ramstein | 9 January | Attended the 25th Ramstein meeting at the Ramstein Air Base. Met with Secretary General of NATO Mark Rutte and US Defense Secretary Lloyd Austin. | |
| 71 | Italy | Rome | 10 January | Met with Prime Minister Giorgia Meloni and President Sergio Mattarella. | |
| 72 | Poland | Warsaw | 15 January | Met with Prime Minister Donald Tusk, whose government currently holds the Presidency of the Council of the European Union. | |
| 73 | Switzerland | Davos | 20–24 January | Attended the World Economic Forum in Davos and made an address to world leaders. | |
| 74 | Poland | Auschwitz-Birkenau | 27 January | Participated in the events marking the 80th anniversary of the liberation of the Nazi concentration camp Auschwitz-Birkenau. Met with French President Emmanuel Macron and President of the European Council António Costa. | |
| 75 | Germany | Munich | 14–16 February | Participated in the Munich Security Conference. Met with US Vice President JD Vance. | |
| 75 | United Arab Emirates | Abu Dhabi | 17 February | Met with President Sheikh Mohamed bin Zayed Al Nahyan. | |
| 75 | Turkey | Ankara | 18 February | Met with President Recep Tayyip Erdoğan. | |
| 76 | Ireland | Shannon | 27 February | Met with Taoiseach Micheál Martin at Shannon Airport. | |
| 76 | United States | Washington, D.C. | 28 February | Main article: 2025 Trump–Zelenskyy Oval Office meeting Met with President Donald Trump and Vice President JD Vance at the White House, but the meeting ended early due to an argument. | |
| 76 | United Kingdom | London, Sandringham | 1–2 March | Main article: 2025 London Summit on Ukraine Met with Prime Minister Keir Starmer. Attended an emergency summit between UK, Ukraine, Canada, Norway and 13 EU countries following the clash with Trump. Later met with King Charles III at Sandringham House, the King's country residence. | |
| 77 | Belgium | Brussels | 6 March | Attended the 247th European Council meeting. | |
| 78 | Saudi Arabia | Jeddah | 10–11 March | Met with Crown Prince Mohammed bin Salman. Discussed US–Russia peace negotiation process. | |
| 79 | Finland | Helsinki | 18 March | Met with Prime Minister Petteri Orpo and President Alexander Stubb. | |
| 79 | Norway | Oslo | 19–20 March | Met with Prime Minister Jonas Gahr Støre. | |
| 80 | France | Paris | 26–27 March | Attended the third coalition of the willing summit. | |
| 81 | South Africa | Pretoria | 24–25 April | Met with President Cyril Ramaphosa. | |
| 81 | Vatican City | Rome | 26 April | Attended the funeral of Pope Francis. Met with French President Emmanuel Macron, UK Prime Minister Keir Starmer and US President Donald Trump. | |
| 81 | Italy | Rome | 26 April | Met with Prime Minister Giorgia Meloni. | |
| 82 | Czech Republic | Prague | 4 May | Met with President Petr Pavel. | |
| 83 | Turkey | Ankara | 15 May | Met with President Recep Tayyip Erdoğan. | |
| 83 | Montenegro | Podgorica | 15 May | Met with President Jakov Milatović. Signed a security cooperation agreement. | |
| 83 | Albania | Tirana | 16 May | Met with Prime Minister Edi Rama. Attended the 6th European Political Community Summit. | |
| 83 | Italy | Rome | 17 May | Met with Swiss President Karin Keller-Sutter and Canadian Prime Minister Mark Carney. | |
| 83 | Vatican City | Rome | 17 May | Attended the inauguration of Pope Leo XIV. | |
| 84 | Germany | Berlin | 28 May | Met with President Frank-Walter Steinmeier and Chancellor Friedrich Merz. | |
| 85 | Lithuania | Vilnius | 2 June | Met with President Gitanas Nausėda and NATO Secretary General Mark Rutte. Attended the Bucharest Nine summit and the Nordic–Baltic Eight summit. | |
| 86 | Austria | Vienna | 16 June | Met with President Alexander Van der Bellen. | |
| 86 | Canada | Kananaskis | 17 June | Met with Prime Minister Mark Carney. Attended the 51st G7 summit. | |
| 87 | United Kingdom | London | 23 June | Met with King Charles III, Prime Minister Keir Starmer and speakers of both houses of parliament. | |
| 87 | Netherlands | The Hague | 24–25 June | Attended the 2025 The Hague NATO summit. Met with US President Donald Trump. | |
| 87 | France | Strasbourg | 26 June | Met with Secretary General of Council of Europe Alain Berset. | |
| 88 | Denmark | Aarhus, Copenhagen | 3–4 July | Met with King Frederik X, Prime Minister Mette Frederiksen, whose government currently holds the Presidency of the Council of the European Union, President of the European Commission Ursula von der Leyen and President of the European Council António Costa. | |
| 89 | Vatican City | Rome | 9 July | Met with Pope Leo XIV. | |
| 89 | Italy | Rome | 10–11 July | Met with President Sergio Mattarella and Keith Kellogg. Attended the eighth Ukraine Recovery Conference. | |
| 90 | Germany | Berlin | 13 August | Met with Chancellor Friedrich Merz. | |
| 90 | United Kingdom | London | 14 August | Met with Prime Minister Keir Starmer. | |
| 91 | Belgium | Brussels | 17 August | Met with President of the European Commission Ursula von der Leyen. | |
| 91 | United States | Washington, D.C. | 18 August | Main article: August 2025 White House multilateral meeting on Ukraine Met with President Donald Trump, along with President of the European Commission Ursula von der Leyen, President of France Emmanuel Macron, Prime Minister of the United Kingdom Keir Starmer, Chancellor of Germany Friedrich Merz, Prime Minister of Italy Giorgia Meloni, and President of Finland Alexander Stubb. | |
| 92 | Denmark | Copenhagen | 3 September | Met with Prime Minister Mette Frederiksen. Attended the Nordic-Baltic Eight summit. | |
| 92 | France | Paris | 4 September | Met with President Emmanuel Macron. Attended the 7th Coalition of the willing summit. | |
| 93 | United States | New York City | 24 September | Met with President Donald Trump and President of Syria Ahmed Al Sharaa. Zelenskyy announced the restoration of Ukraine-Syria relations after the Fall of the Assad regime. Attended the 80th United Nations General Assembly. | |
| 94 | Denmark | Copenhagen | 2 October | Met with Prime Minister Mette Frederiksen. Attended the 7th EPC summit. | |
| 95 | United States | Washington, D.C. | 17 October | Met with President Donald Trump. | |
| 96 | Norway | Oslo | 22 October | Met with Prime Minister Jonas Gahr Støre. | |
| 96 | Sweden | Linköping | 22 October | Met with Prime Minister Ulf Kristersson. | |
| 96 | Belgium | Brussels | 23 October | Attended the 252nd European Council summit. | |
| 96 | United Kingdom | London | 24 October | Met with King Charles III and Prime Minister Keir Starmer. Attended the 8th Coalition of the willing meeting. | |
| 97 | Greece | Athens | 16 November | Met with Prime Minister Kyriakos Mitsotakis. | |
| 97 | France | Paris | 17 November | Met with President Emmanuel Macron. | |
| 97 | Spain | Madrid | 18 November | Met with King Felipe VI and Prime Minister Pedro Sánchez. | |
| 97 | Turkey | Ankara | 19 November | Met with President Recep Tayyip Erdoğan. | |
| 98 | France | Paris | 1 December | Met with President Emmanuel Macron. | |
| 98 | Ireland | Dublin | 2 December | Met with Taoiseach Micheál Martin and President Catherine Connolly, addressed the Oireachtas, and went to the inauguration of the Ireland-Ukraine Economic Forum. | |
| 99 | United Kingdom | London | 8 December | Met with Prime Minister Keir Starmer, President of France Emmanuel Macron and Chancellor of Germany Friedrich Merz to discuss the Trump peace plan. | |
| 99 | Belgium | Brussels | 9 December | Met with Secretary General of NATO Mark Rutte, President of the European Commission Ursula von der Leyen and President of the European Council António Costa to discuss the Trump peace plan. | |
| 99 | Italy | Rome | 10 December | Met with president Sergio Mattarella and Prime Minister Giorgia Meloni to discuss the Trump peace plan. | |
| 99 | Vatican City | Rome | 10 December | Met with Pope Leo XIV to discuss the Trump peace plan. | |
| 100 | Germany | Berlin | 14–15 December | Met with President Frank-Walter Steinmeier, President of the Bundestag Julia Klöckner and Supreme Allied Commander Europe General Alexus Grynkewich. Attended a meeting with US envoys Steve Witkoff and Jared Kushner along with Chancellor Friedrich Merz, Prime Minister of Norway Jonas Gahr Støre, Prime Minister of Denmark Mette Frederiksen, Prime Minister of Sweden Ulf Kristersson, President of France Emmanuel Macron, President of Finland Alexander Stubb, Prime Minister Donald Tusk, Prime Minister of the United Kingdom Keir Starmer, Prime Minister of the Netherlands Dick Schoof, Prime Minister of Italy Giorgia Meloni, Secretary General of NATO Mark Rutte, President of the European Commission Ursula von der Leyen and President of the European Council António Costa to discuss the Trump peace plan. | |
| 100 | Netherlands | Amsterdam | 16 December | Met with King Willem-Alexander and Prime Minister Dick Schoof to discuss the Trump peace plan. Met with President of Moldova Maia Sandu. Addressed the States General. | |
| 100 | Belgium | Brussels | 17–18 December | Attended the 254th European Council meeting to discuss the Trump peace plan. | |
| 100 | Poland | Warsaw | 19 December | Met with President Karol Nawrocki and Prime Minister Donald Tusk to discuss the Trump peace plan. | |
| 101 | Canada | Halifax | 27 December | Met with Prime Minister Mark Carney to discuss the Trump peace plan. | |
| 101 | United States | Washington, D.C., Miami, Palm Beach | 28–29 December | Met with President Donald Trump at Mar-a-Lago to discuss the Trump peace plan. | |

== 2026 ==
| # | Country | Areas visited | Dates | Details | Image |
|---|---|---|---|---|---|
| 102 | France | Paris | 6 January | Attended a meeting of the Coalition of the Willing to discuss peace talks for the Ukraine War with United States mediators Steve Witkoff and Jared Kushner. President Emmanuel Macron and Prime Minister of the United Kingdom Keir Starmer signed a joint declaration pledging to deploy British and French troops to Ukraine in the event of a peace deal. | |
| 102 | Cyprus | Nicosia | 7 January | Met with President Nikos Christodoulides, whose government currently holds the Presidency of the Council of the European Union. | |
| 103 | Switzerland | Davos | 22 January | Attended the World Economic Forum meeting. Met with President of the United States Donald Trump. | |
| 104 | Lithuania | Vilnius | 25 January | Met with President Gitanas Nausėda. | |
| 105 | Germany | Munich | 13–14 February | Attended the 62nd Munich Security Conference. Met with Chancellor Friedrich Merz. | |
| 106 | Romania | Bucharest | 12 March | Met with president Nicușor Dan. | |
| 106 | France | Paris | 13 March | Met with President Emmanuel Macron. | |
| 107 | United Kingdom | London | 17 March | Met with Prime Minister Keir Starmer. | |
| 107 | Spain | Madrid | 18 March | Met with Prime Minister Pedro Sánchez. | |
| 108 | Saudi Arabia | Jeddah | 26 March | Met with Crown Prince Mohammed bin Salman. | |
| 108 | United Arab Emirates | Abu Dhabi | 27 March | Met with President Sheikh Mohamed bin Zayed Al Nahyan. | |
| 108 | Qatar | Doha | 28 March | Met with Emir Tamim bin Hamad Al Thani. | |
| 108 | Jordan | Amman | 29–30 March | Met with King Abdullah II. | |
| 109 | Turkey | Istanbul | 4 April | Met with President Recep Tayyip Erdoğan. | |
| 109 | Syria | Damascus | 5 April | Met with President Ahmed al-Sharaa. | |
| 110 | Germany | Berlin | 13 April | Met with Chancellor Friedrich Merz. | |
| 110 | Norway | Oslo | 14 April | Met with Prim Minister Jonas Gahr Støre. | |
| 110 | Italy | Rome | 15 April | Met with President Sergio Mattarella and Prime Minister Giorgia Meloni. | |
| 110 | Netherlands | Amsterdam | 16 April | Met with Prime Minister Rob Jetten. | |
| 111 | Cyprus | Nicosia | 23 April | Attended the 258th European Council meeting. Met with President of Lithuania Gitanas Nauseda, Prime Minister of Denmark Mette Frederiksen, President of the European Council António Costa and President of the European Commission Ursula von der Leyen. | |
| 111 | Saudi Arabia | Jeddah | 24 April | Met with Crown Prince Mohammed bin Salman. | |
| 111 | Azerbaijan | Baku | 25 April | Met with President Ilham Aliyev. | |
| 112 | Armenia | Yerevan | 3–5 May | Attended the 8th European Political Community Summit. Met with Prime Minister Nikol Pashinyan and President Vahagn Khachaturian. | |
| 112 | Bahrain | Manama | 6 May | Met with Crown Prince Salman bin Hamad Al Khalifa and King Hamad bin Isa Al Khalifa. | |
| 113 | Romania | Bucharest | 13 May | Attended the Bucharest Nine summit and the Nordic–Baltic Eight summit. | |
| 114 | Sweden | Uppsala | 28 May | Met with Prime Minister Ulf Kristersson. | |
| 115 | United Kingdom | London | 7–8 June | Met with Prime Minister Keir Starmer, Chancellor of Germany Friedrich Merz and President of France Emmanuel Macron to discuss support for Ukraine. Met with King Charles III at Windsor Castle. | |
| 115 | Estonia | Tallinn | 9 June | Met with President Alar Karis. Attended the Nordic-Baltic Eight summit. | |
| 116 | Switzerland | Geneva | 15 June | Met with President Guy Parmelin | |
| 116 | France | Évian-les-Bains | 16–17 June | Met with President Emmanuel Macron. Attended the 52nd G7 summit. He proposed a face-to-face meeting with President of Russia Vladimir Putin at the summit, though Putin rejected the idea. | |
| 116 | Belgium | Brussels | 18–19 June | Attended the 259th European Council meeting. Met with President of the European Council António Costa and President of the European Commission Ursula von der Leyen. | |
| 117 | Ireland | Dublin | 1 July | Met with Taoiseach Micheál Martin. | |
| 118 | Turkey | Ankara | 7–8 July | Attended the 2026 Ankara NATO summit. Met with President of the United States Donald Trump. | |
| 119 | France | Paris | 13–14 July | Attended a meeting of the Coalition of the Willing. Also attended Bastille Day celebrations. | |
| 120 | United Kingdom | Portsmouth | 27 July | Met with Prime Minister Andy Burnham. | |
| 120 | United States | Washington, D.C. | 28 July | Attended the funeral of Senator Lindsey Graham. Met with President Donald Trump and Prime Minister of Israel Benjamin Netanyahu. | |
| 120 | Poland | Lublin | 29 July | Met with Prime Minister Donald Tusk. | |
| 121 | Serbia | Belgrade | 7–8 August | Met with Prime Minister Đuro Macut and President Aleksandar Vučić. | |
| 122 | Moldova | Chișinău | 27 August | Attended celebrations for the 35th anniversary of Independence of Moldova. Met with President Maia Sandu and President of Romania Nicusor Dan. | |
| 123 | Norway | Oslo | 8–9 September | Met with Prime Minister Jonas Gahr Støre. Participated in a joint meeting of companies involved in the Freyja anti-ballistic missile program. Attended the funeral of King Harald V. | |
| 123 | Iceland | Keflavík International Airport | 9 September | Met with Foreign Minister Þorgerður Katrín Gunnarsdóttir. | |
| 123 | Canada | Calgary, Banff, Toronto, North Bay | 10–11 September | Met with Prime Minister Mark Carney and joined a meeting of the Canadian Cabinet. Visited the Jack Garland Airport and met with the Ukrainian military pilots training there. Met with members of the Ukrainian community and with representatives of Canadian companies and organizations interested in collaboration with Ukraine. | |
| 124 | Ireland | Shannon Airport | 21 September | Met with Director of the Central Intelligence Agency John Ratcliffe. | |
| 124 | United States | New York City | 22–26 September | Attended the 81th United Nations General Assembly. Met with President Donald Trump. | |
| 125 | United Kingdom | London | 14 October | Met with King Charles III and Prime Minister Andy Burnham. | |
| 125 | Belgium | Brussels | 15–16 October | Attended the 260th European Council meeting. | |
| 126 | Norway | Oslo | 20 October | Met with Prime Minister Jonas Gahr Store and President of Finland Alexander Stubb. Held talks with United States special envoys Steve Witkoff and Jared Kushner. | |
| 127 | Netherlands | The Hague | 28 October | Met with Prime Minister Rob Jetten, heads of Dutch and Ukrainian companies as well as King Willem-Alexander. | |
| 128 | Turkey | Istanbul | 31 October | Met with President Recep Tayyip Erdoğan and Ecumenical Patriarch Bartholomew. | |
| 129 | Germany | Berlin | 3 November | Met with Chancellor Friedrich Merz. | |
| 129 | Spain | Madrid | 4–5 November | Attended the 30th Ibero-American Summit. Met with Prime Minister Pedro Sánchez, King Felipe VI, Secretary-General of the United Nations António Guterres and President of the European Council António Costa. | |
| 130 | Denmark | Copenhagen | 10–11 November | Met with Prime Minister Mette Frederiksen. | |
| 130 | Ireland | Dublin | 12–13 November | Attended the 9th European Political Community Summit. Met with Taoiseach Micheál Martin. Held talks with United States special envoys Steve Witkoff and Jared Kushner following the United States–Ukraine–Russia meetings in Abu Dhabi. | |
| 131 | Germany | Berlin | 19 November | Attended a meeting of the Coalition of the willing. Met with United States special envoys Steve Witkoff and Jared Kushner. | |

== Future trips ==
| Country | Location | Date | Details |
|---|---|---|---|
| India | New Delhi | TBD | Official visit |

== Canceled visits ==
Planned but canceled presidential trips
| Country | Areas planned for the visit | Planned date(s) | Details |
|---|---|---|---|
| Belarus | Minsk | 8–9 October 2020 | It was planned to be a state visit as well as a chance to attend the Forum of Regions. It was postponed in August 2020 due to the 2020–2021 Belarusian protests. |
| Saudi Arabia | Riyadh | 18 February 2025 (Note: Rescheduled on 10–11 March.) | Planned state visit to Saudi Arabia and meeting with Crown Prince Mohammed bin Salman. Visit was canceled after the beginning of US–Russia negotiations in Riyadh, and Zelenskyy instead travelled to Ankara to meet President Erdoğan. |
| Kazakhstan | Astana | 24 April 2026 | Planned state visit to Kazakhstan and meeting with President Kassym-Jomart Tokayev. But strong pressure from the Kremlin and the Kazakh government's decision to cancel due to we were unable to carry out an official visit. Zelenskyy instead travelled to Baku to meet President Ilham Aliyev. |

== Multilateral meetings ==
| Group | Year | | | | | | | | |
| Group | 2019 | 2020 | 2021 | 2022 | 2023 | 2024 | 2025 | 2026 | 2027 |
|---|---|---|---|---|---|---|---|---|---|
| UNGA | 24–25 September, (United States) New York City | 26 September, (United States) New York City | 23 September, (United States) New York City | 20–26 September, (United States) New York City | 18–22 September, (United States) New York City | 23–29 September, (United States) New York City | 24 September, (United States) New York City | 22–26 September, (United States) New York City | |
| G7 (not a member) | Not Invited | | | 26–28 June, (Germany) Schloss Elmau | 19–21 May, (Japan) Hiroshima | 13–15 June, (Italy) Fasano | 16–17 June, (Canada) Kananaskis | 15–17 June, (France) Évian-les-Bains | |
| NATO (not a member) | Not Invited | | | 24 March, (Belgium) Brussels | 11–12 July, (Lithuania) Vilnius | 9–11 July, (United States) Washington, D.C. | 24–25 June, (Netherlands) The Hague | 7–8 July, (Turkey) Ankara | |
| NATO (not a member) | Not Invited | | | 28–30 June, (Spain) Madrid | 11–12 July, (Lithuania) Vilnius | 9–11 July, (United States) Washington, D.C. | 24–25 June, (Netherlands) The Hague | 7–8 July, (Turkey) Ankara | |
| EU–Ukraine | 8 July, (Ukraine) Kyiv | 6 October, (Belgium) Brussels | 12 October, (Ukraine) Kyiv | none | 3 February, (Ukraine) Kyiv | none | none | none | |
| Ukraine Recovery Conference | 1–3 July, (Canada) Toronto | None | 7 July, (Lithuania) Vilnius | 4–5 July, (Switzerland) Lugano | 21–22 June, (United Kingdom) London | 11–12 June, (Germany) Berlin | 10–11 July, (Italy) Rome | 25–26 June, (Poland) Gdańsk | 27–28 January, (Estonia) Tallinn |
| WEF | | 22 January, (Switzerland) Davos | 17–20 January, (cancelled) (Switzerland) Davos | 22–26 May, (Switzerland) Davos | 16–20 January, (Switzerland) Davos | 15–16 January, (Switzerland) Davos | 20–24 January, (Switzerland) Davos | 22 January, (Switzerland) Davos | |
| EPC | Did not exist | | | 6 October, (Czech Republic) Prague | 1 June, (Moldova) Bulboaca | 18 July, (United Kingdom) Woodstock | 16 May, (Albania) Tirana | 4 May, (Armenia) Yerevan | |
| EPC | Did not exist | | | 6 October, (Czech Republic) Prague | 5 October, (Spain) Granada | 7 November, (Hungary) Budapest | 2 October, (Denmark) Copenhagen | 12 November, (Republic of Ireland) Dublin | |
| Others | Normandy Format; 9 December, (France); Paris | None | Crimea Platform; 23 August, (Ukraine) Kyiv | None | Coronation of King Charles III and Queen Camilla; 5–6 May,^{[a]} (United Kingdom) London | Three Seas Initiative; 11 April, (Lithuania) Vilnius | Securing our future summit 2 March, (United Kingdom) London | Together for peace and security summit 6 January, (France) Paris | |
| Others | Normandy Format; 9 December, (France); Paris | None | Crimea Platform; 23 August, (Ukraine) Kyiv | None | Coronation of King Charles III and Queen Camilla; 5–6 May,^{[a]} (United Kingdom) London | Global Peace Summit; 15–16 June, (Switzerland) Lucerne | Second coalition of the willing summit 15 March, United Kingdom | Bucharest Nine; 13 May, (Romania) Bucharest | |
| Others | Normandy Format; 9 December, (France); Paris | None | Crimea Platform; 23 August, (Ukraine) Kyiv | None | Coronation of King Charles III and Queen Camilla; 5–6 May,^{[a]} (United Kingdom) London | Global Peace Summit; 15–16 June, (Switzerland) Lucerne | Building a robust peace for Ukraine and Europe summit 27 March, (France) Paris | Determined to act 13 July, (France) Paris | |
| Others | Normandy Format; 9 December, (France); Paris | None | Crimea Platform; 23 August, (Ukraine) Kyiv | None | Coronation of King Charles III and Queen Camilla; 5–6 May,^{[a]} (United Kingdom) London | Global Peace Summit; 15–16 June, (Switzerland) Lucerne | Bucharest Nine; 2 June, (Lithuania) Vilnius | Determined to act 13 July, (France) Paris | |
██ = Future event ██ = Video conference participation ██ = Did not attend / participate.^aPrime Minister Denys Shmyhal attended in the president's place.

== See also ==
- List of international presidential trips made by Petro Poroshenko, his direct predecessor
- List of international presidential trips made by Viktor Yanukovych, one of his predecessors
