= List of international presidential trips made by Viktor Yanukovych =

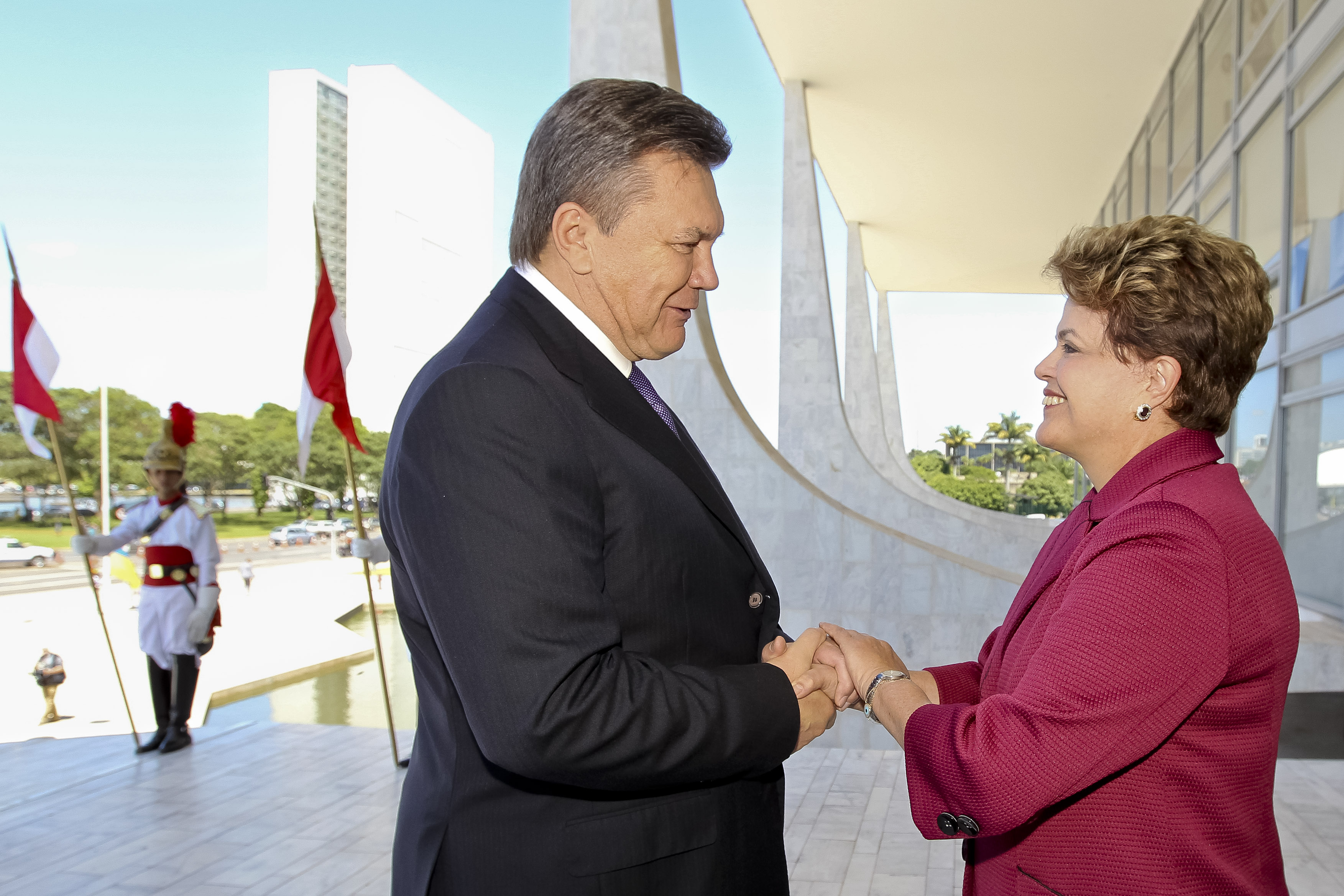
Brazilian President Dilma Rousseff greets Yanukovych upon his arrival to the Planalto Palace in Brasília, Brazil, 25 October 2011.

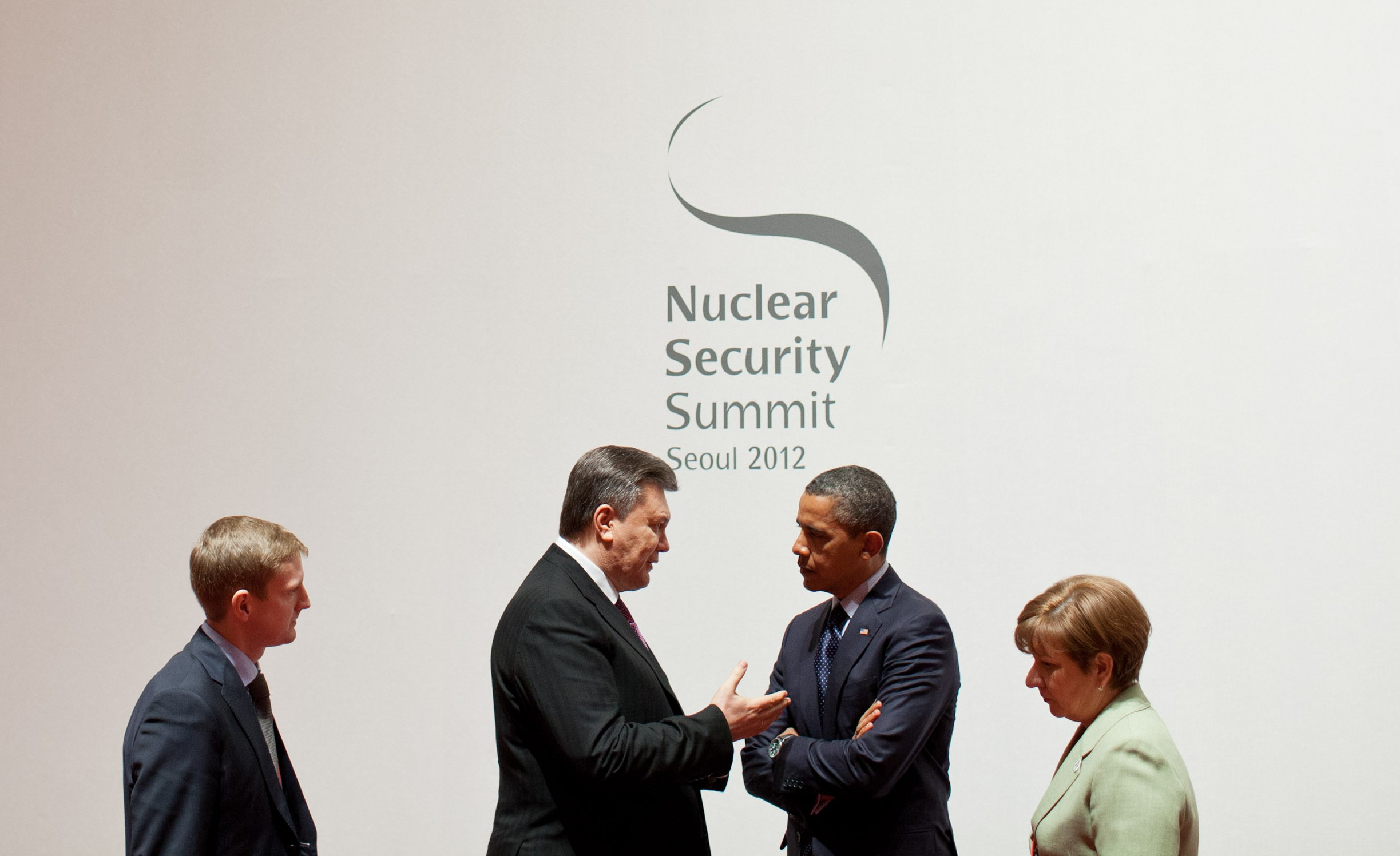
Barack Obama talks with President Viktor Yanukovych during a pull aside at the 2012 Nuclear Security Summit at the Coex Center in Seoul

Viktor Yanukovych made several international trips in his capacity as the president of Ukraine from 25 February 2010 – 22 February 2014.

== Summary ==
=== 2010 ===
Country	Areas visited	Date(s)	Notes
Belgium	Brussels	1 March.	
Kazakhstan	Astana	7 April	
United States	Washington	12-13 April	
France	Strasbourg	27 April	
Belarus	Minsk	29 April	
Greece	Athens, Thessaloniki	6-7 June	
Turkey	Istanbul	8 June	
Kazakhstan	Nur-Sultan	5 July	
Germany	Berlin	30 August	
China	Beijing, Hong Kong, Shanghai	1-6 September	
United States	New York	22 September	
France	Paris	7-8 October	
Lithuania	Vilnius	14 October	
Belgium	Brussels	22 November	
Kazakhstan	Nur-Sultan	1 December	2010 OSCE Summit in Astana
Latvia	Riga	15 December	State visit

=== 2011 ===
Country	Areas visited	Date(s)	Notes
Japan	Tokyo, Kyoto	18-20 January	
Switzerland	Davos	27-28 January	
Poland	Warsaw, Gdansk	3-4 February	
Vietnam	Hanoi	25-27 March	
Singapore	Singapore	28-29 March	
Brunei	Bandar Seri Begawan	30-31 March	
Azerbaijan	Baku	28-29 April	
Poland	Warsaw	27-28 May	
Slovakia	Bratislava	17 June	
France	Strasbourg	21 June	
Poland	Gdansk	30 August	
Turkmenistan	Ashgabat	12-13 September	
United States	New York	19-23 September	
Greece	Athens	6-7 October	
Cuba	Havana	20-23 October	
Brazil	Brasilia	23-25 October	
Poland	Warsaw	15 November	
Israel	Tel Aviv	30 November-1 December	
Turkey	Ankara	22 December	
Tajikistan	Dushanbe	2-3 September	

=== 2012 ===
Country	Areas visited	Date(s)	Notes
Switzerland	Davos	25-27 January	
Germany	Munich	3-4 February	
Russia	Moscow	19-20 March	
South Korea	Seoul	26 March	
Jordan	Amman	16-17 April	
Russia	Moscow	15 May	
United States	Chicago	21 May	
Turkey	Ankara	5 June	
Poland	Warsaw	8 June	
United States	New York	24-26 September	
Russia	Moscow	22 October	
Cyprus	Nicosia	8-9 November	
United Arab Emirates	Abu Dhabi	25-27 November	
Qatar	Doha	27-28 November	
Turkmenistan	Ashgabat	4-5 December	
India	New Delhi	9-12 December	
Azerbaijan	Baku	12 December	

=== 2013 ===
Country	Areas visited	Date(s)	Notes
Switzerland	Davos	23-24 January	
Lithuania	Vilnius	6 February	
Turkmenistan	Ashgabat	12-14 February	
Poland	Wisła	20 February	
Belgium	Brussels	25 February	
Russia	Moscow	4 March	
Poland	Warsaw	22 March	
Russia	Sochi	26 May	
Kazakhstan	Nur-Sultan	28-29 May	
Poland	Wisła	3 July	
Poland	Krakow	7 October	
Turkey	Ankara	9 October	
Estonia	Tallinn	15 October	
Belarus	Minsk	25 October	
Austria	Vienna	21 November	
Lithuania	Vilnius	28 November	
China	Beijing	3-6 December	
Russia	Sochi	6 December	
Russia	Moscow	16-17 December	

=== 2014 ===
Country	Areas visited	Date(s)	Notes
Russia	Sochi	6–7 February	Working visit

== See also ==
- List of international presidential trips made by Petro Poroshenko, his successor
- List of international presidential trips made by Volodymyr Zelenskyy, his subsequent successor
