= Azerbaijanis in Ukraine =

Ethnic group

Total population
- 42,200 (2001) - 500 000

Regions with significant populations
- Donetsk Oblast, Kharkiv Oblast, Dnipropetrovsk Oblast

Languages
- Azerbaijani (52%), Russian (37%)

Religion
- Predominately Muslim

Related ethnic groups
- Azerbaijani diaspora

Azerbaijan and Ukraine relations took through centuries and both countries used to be the part of Russian Empire and then Soviet Union. Currently there are over 45,000 Azerbaijanis in Ukraine. Most of them live in Donetsk Oblast (8 thousand), Kharkiv - (5-6 thousand), and Dnipropetrovsk - (5-6 thousand people). The number of ethnic groups grew very rapidly - especially between 1960 and 1990, it increased 5.5 times, largely due to instability in the South Caucasus. Today, Ukraine is home to the 7th largest Azerbaijani community in the world.

The resettlement of Azerbaijanis into the territory of Ukraine is marked by certain historical events, dominated by migration processes that were primarily economic in nature. About 2,300 Azerbaijanis are native Ukrainian speakers. Ukraine is also host to a number of Azerbaijani guest workers which has yet to be ascertained.

The majority of Azerbaijanis are Muslim, mainly Shia. Azerbaijanis are one of the least religious nations in the world. They don't regularly practice their religion or show their faith in the way they dress.

Currently, 15 regions of Ukraine have national cultural societies for Azerbaijanis. In eight regions, Sunday schools study Azerbaijani language and literature. Publication of the magazine Voice of Azerbaijan (Azerbaijani and Ukrainian) began in Kyiv in 1998. The first Azerbaijani newspaper in Ukraine, Millət (The Nation), has been published since 1991 in Crimea.

== Events ==
On 20 January 2011, the embassy of Azerbaijan and the Congress of Ukrainian Azerbaijanis hosted a commemorative ceremony dedicated to the Khojaly Massacre, the March Days and Black January. Heads of regional organizations of the Congress of Ukrainian Azerbaijanis (CUA), members of the Mission of the World Azerbaijanis Congress (WAC) in Ukraine, intellectuals, youth, students and activists of the diaspora celebrate national holidays like Republic Day and National Salvation Day.

In May 2011 a restored monument to Azerbaijani soldiers of the 77th division was opened in Sevastopol.

Because most Azeris live in the eastern parts of Ukraine nearly all of them have fled to Turkey, or Western Ukraine. Many noted they could not stay because they faced discrimination by a population that is undergoing a resurgence of ethnic nationalism.

== Resettlement and language ==
Rank	Place	Number of Azerbaijanis
1	Donetsk	8075
2	Kharkiv Oblast	5684
3	Dnipro	5683
4	Crimea	3748
5	Luhansk Oblast	3121
6	Odesa Oblast	2777
7	Kyiv	2567
8	Zaporizhzhia Oblast	2490

Rank	Native language	Number
1	Azerbaijani language	23 958 (52%)
2	Russian language	16 968 (37%)
3	Ukrainian language	3 224 (7%)
4	Crimean Tatar	102 (0.2%)

== Notable people ==
Ukrainians of Azerbaijani origins

- Oleksandr Aliyev, footballer
- Oleh Babayev, Ukrainian politician, former mayor of Kremenchuk
- Renat Mirzaliyev, judoka
- Ruslan Mirzaliyev, judoka
- Maksym Pashayev, footballer
- Pavlo Pashayev, footballer
- Vugar Rakhimov, Greco-Roman wrestler
- Parviz Nasibov, Greco-Roman wrestler
- Ruslan Zeynalov, footballer

Azerbaijanis of Ukrainian origins

- Aleksandr Chertoganov, footballer
- Marina Durunda, rhythmic gymnast
- Natalya Mammadova, volleyball player
- Valeriya Mammadova, volleyball player
- Oksana Parkhomenko, volleyball player
- Polina Rahimova, volleyball player
- Valeriy Sereda, high jumper
- Mariya Stadnik, wrestler

== See also ==
- Azerbaijanis in Belarus
- Azerbaijanis in Russia
- List of Azerbaijanis
- Azerbaijan–Ukraine relations
- Azerbaijani diaspora
- Ethnic groups in Ukraine
- Turks in Ukraine
