= Azerbaijan–Ukraine relations =

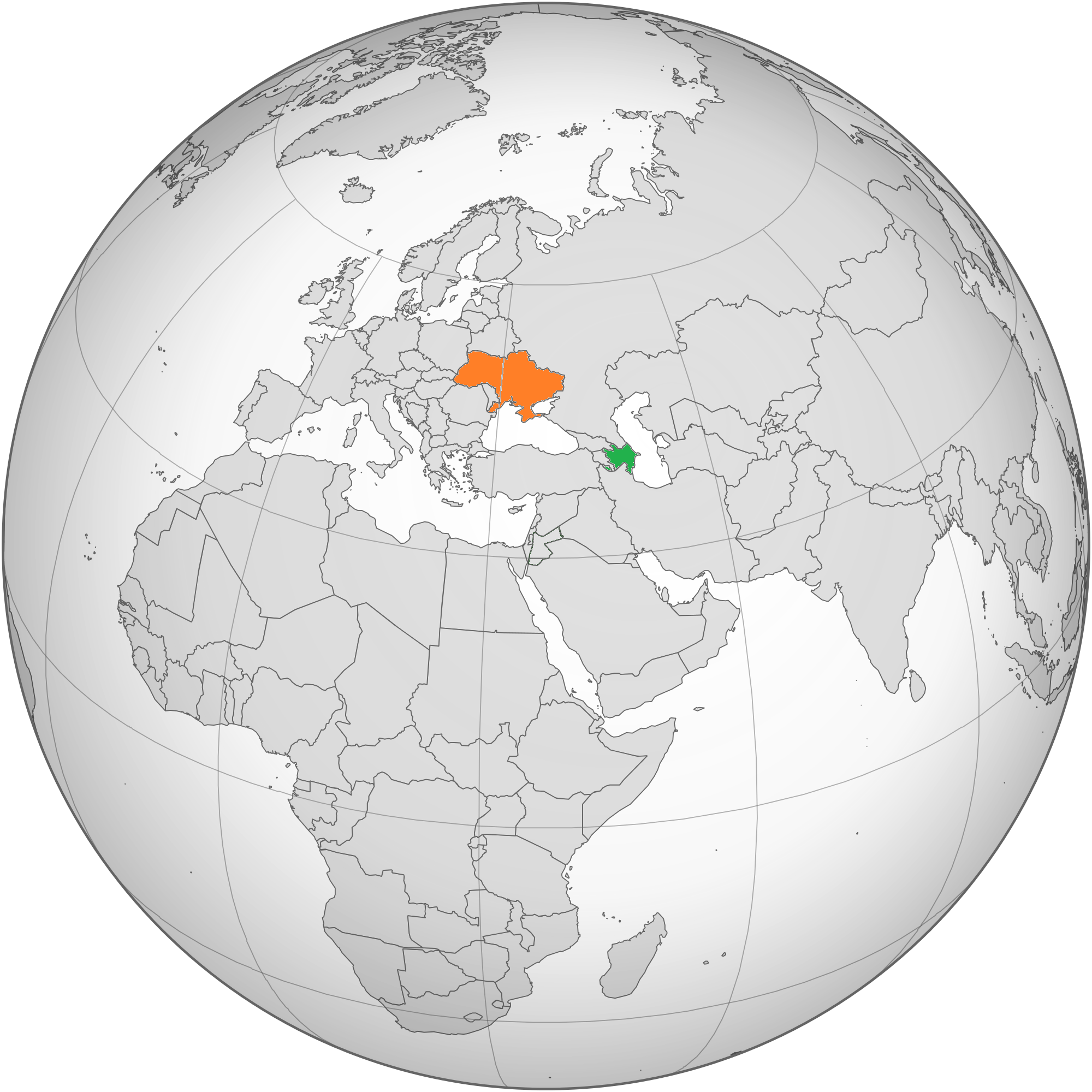

- Azerbaijan: Ukraine

Diplomatic mission
- Embassy of Azerbaijan, Kyiv: Embassy of Ukraine, Baku

Envoy
- Ambassador Seymur Mardaliyev: Ambassador Vladislav Kanevskiy

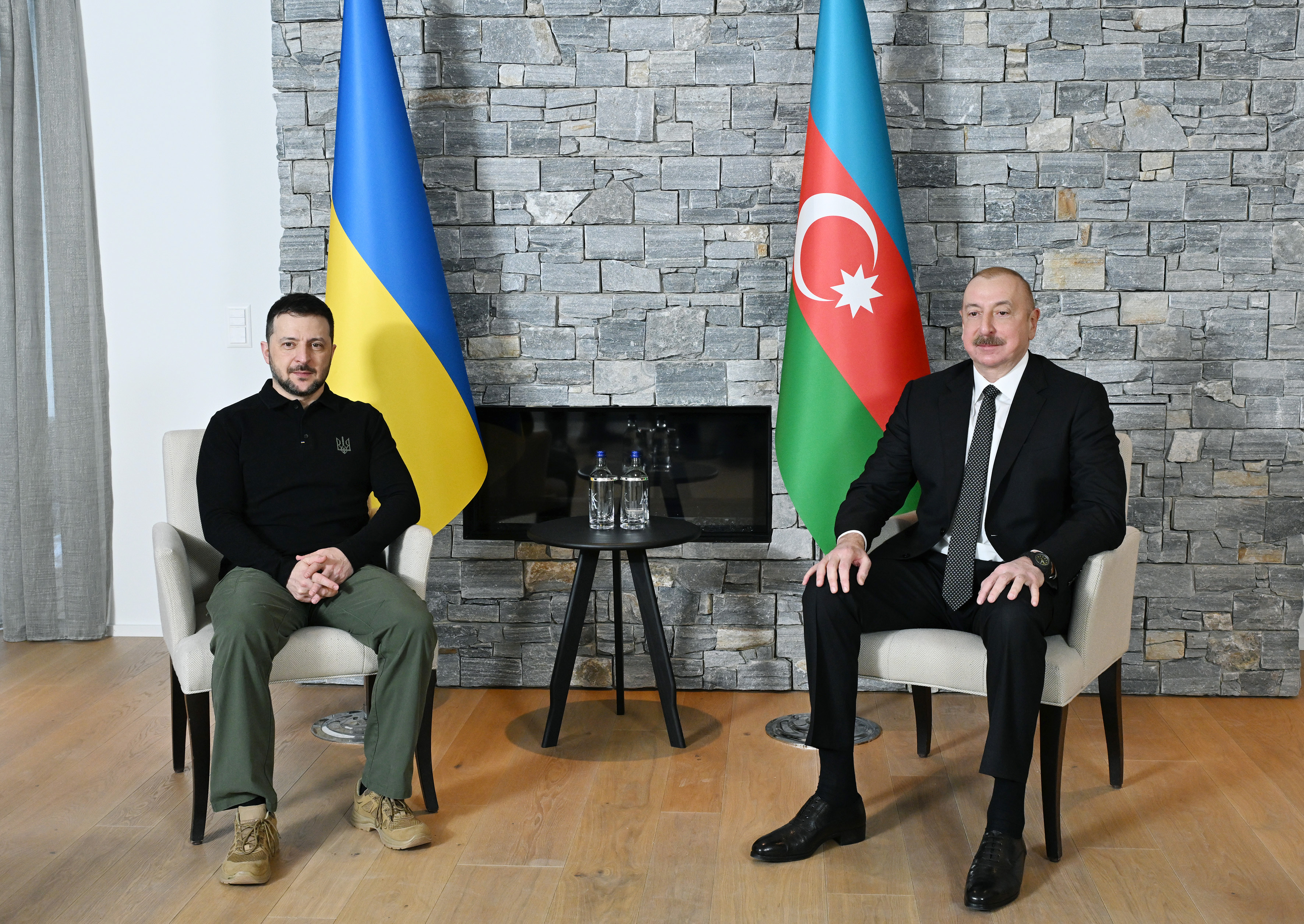
Ukrainian President Volodymyr Zelenskyy and Azerbaijani President Ilham Aliyev in 2025

After the dissolution of the Soviet Union, Azerbaijan and Ukraine gained their independence from the Soviet Union and started a close friendship, establishing diplomatic relations in 1992. The relations of strategic cooperation, political, economical and cultural relations between two countries are at a very high level. Azerbaijan currently plays an important role in both organization and the foreign policy of Ukraine due to its strategic role in the region.

Ukraine supports Azerbaijan's position in the resolution of the Nagorno-Karabakh conflict against Armenia.

The two countries support each other in entering international organizations.

== History ==
=== Relations with the Ukrainian People's Republic and the Ukrainian State ===
Diplomatic relations were established in 1919 for the first time a year after, the Consul General of Ukraine in Tiflis Oleksiy Kulinsky was appointed Consul General in Baku. The grave of Ukrainian Ataman Golovati is still protected by Azerbaijanis; there is also a monument in Lankaran dedicated to Cossacks.

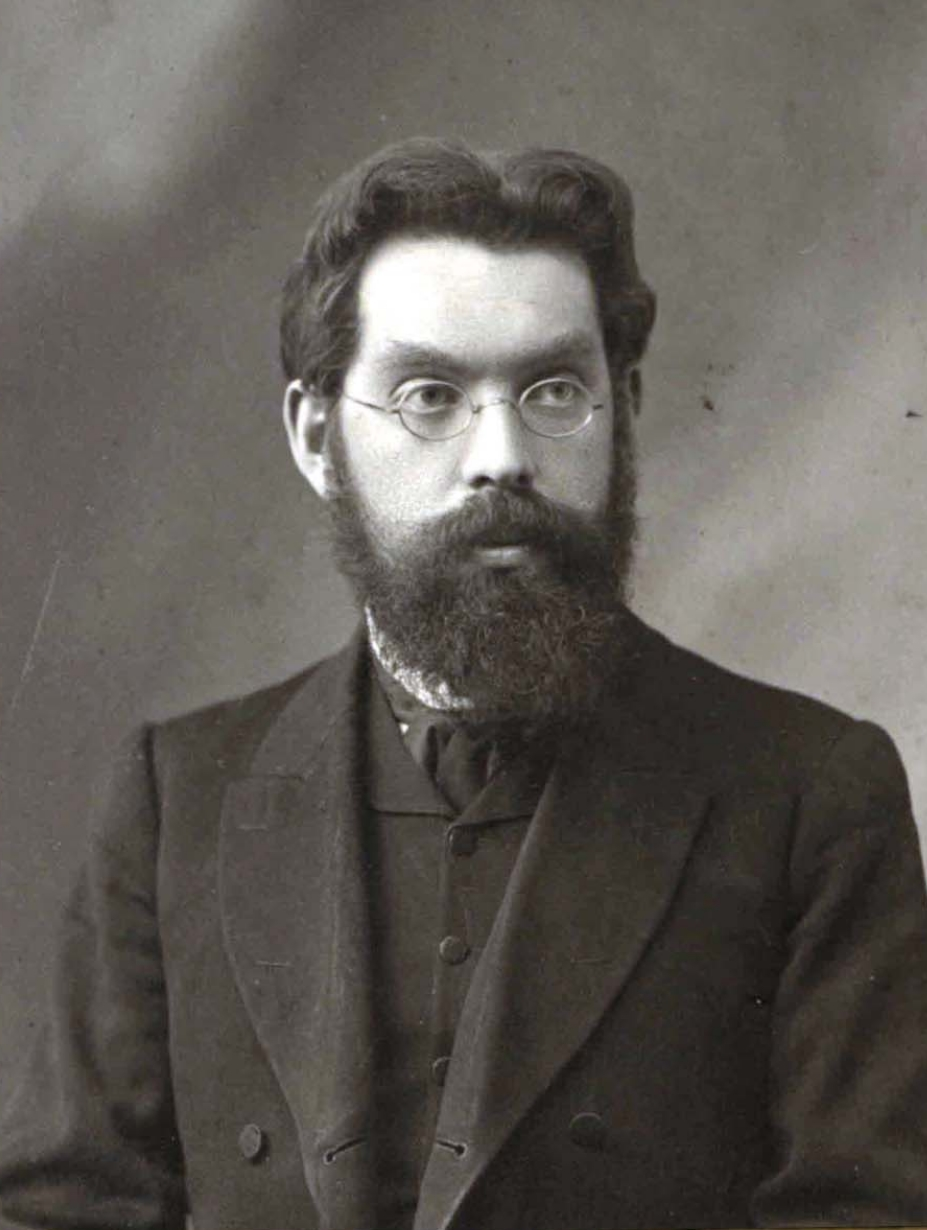
Ivan Kraskovsky

=== Soviet era ===
The Ukrainian Soviet Socialist Republic and the Azerbaijan Soviet Socialist Republic discussed the possibility of concluding a political agreement and exchanging diplomatic missions. On 8 December 1921, the USSR even granted official powers to conduct negotiations to Yuriy Kotsiubynsky, but the initiative was stopped by the Russian Council of People's Commissars. On 30 December 1922, the Treaty on the Creation of the Union of Soviet Socialist Republics was concluded, after which the Azerbaijani trade representation continued to function in Kharkiv for a long time, and the trade and other business representatives of the USSR continued to operate in Baku.

Azerbaijan also helped Ukraine to shelter during the Chernobyl disaster in 1986.

After Black January events, some 10,000 people attended a rally in Lviv to protest Moscow's military intervention in Azerbaijan.

=== Post-1991 ===
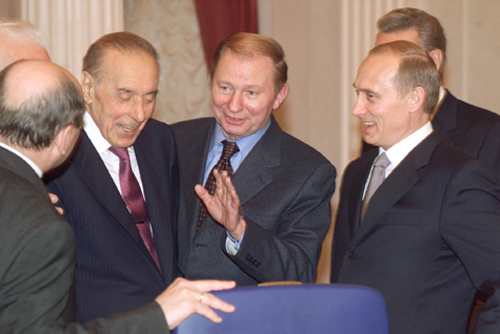
Heydar Aliyev, Leonid Kuchma and Vladimir Putin in 2000

Azerbaijan recognized the independence of Ukraine on 6 February 1992, and on the same day diplomatic relations between the two countries were established. Azerbaijani president Abulfaz Elchibey paid an official visit to Ukraine on 12 November 1992. During that visit, he said that relations with Ukraine will become priority out of all of the former republics of the former Soviet Union. On 5 May 1996, Ukraine opened the Embassy of Ukraine in Azerbaijan in Baku and Azerbaijan opened the Embassy of Azerbaijan in Ukraine on 12 March 1997 in Kyiv.

In 2001, the two countries founded the Organization for Democracy and Economic Development (GUAM), along with Georgia and Moldova.

During the Second Nagorno-Karabakh War, Ukrainian President Volodymyr Zelenskyy stated that Ukraine supports Azerbaijan's territorial integrity, would not provide military assistance to either state.

=== Following the 2022 Russian invasion of Ukraine ===
According to Minister of Foreign Affairs of Azerbaijan Jeyhun Bayramov, the first humanitarian cargo of medicines and other medical items reached Ukraine on 27 February 2022, three days following the 2022 Russian invasion of Ukraine. Up to June 2023, the volume of Azerbaijan’s humanitarian aid to Ukraine exceeds one thousand tons and 20 million US dollars.

In June 2023, President of Azerbaijan Ilham Aliyev and Ukrainian President Volodymyr Zelenskyy met for the first time in Moldova since the Russian invasion of Ukraine the framework of the Summit of the European Political Community, where Zelenskyy thanked the Azerbaijani side for support for Ukraine in the United Nations.

== Political relations ==
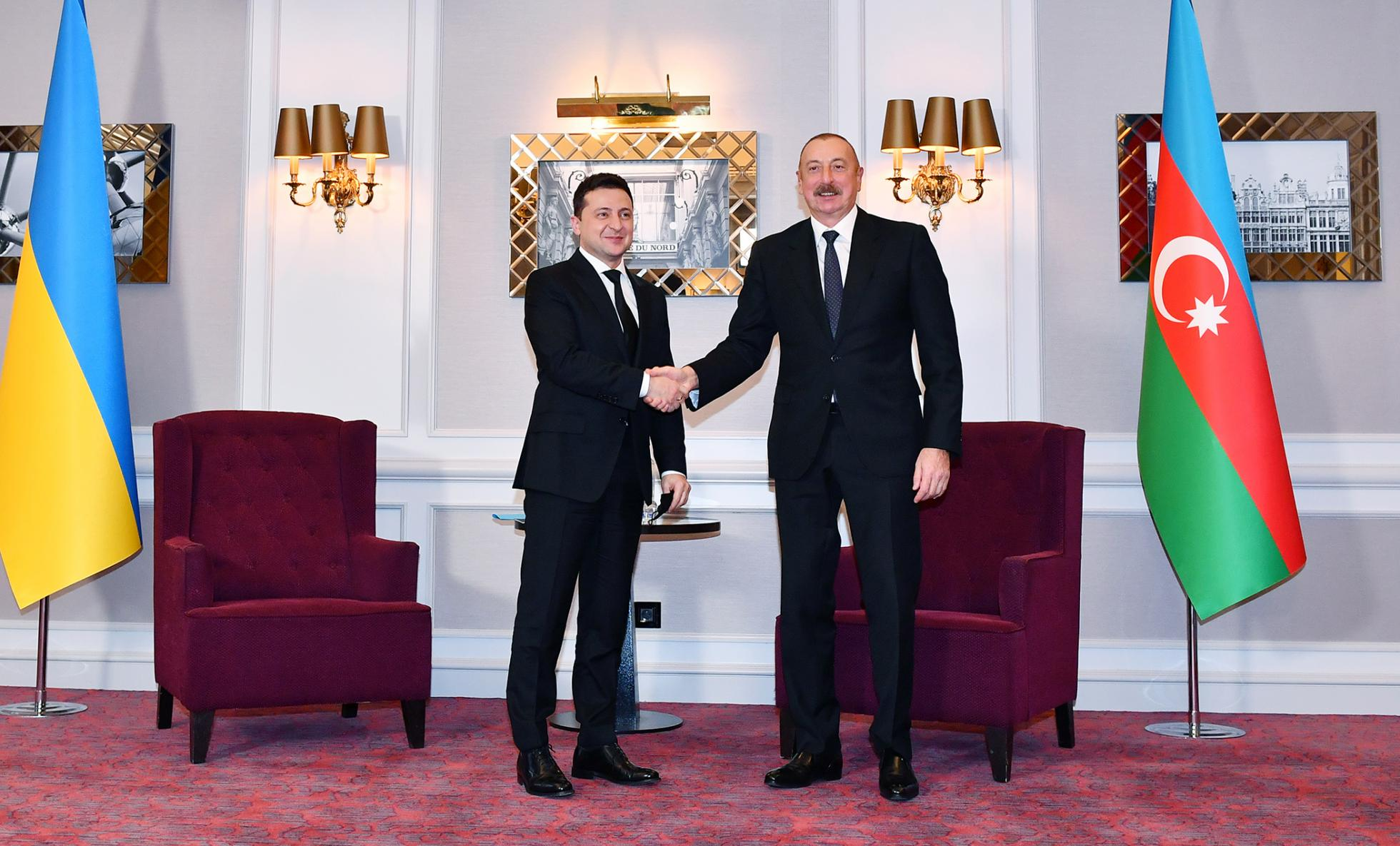
Azerbaijani President Ilham Aliyev and Ukrainian President Volodymyr Zelenskyy

Relations between two countries are very friendly. Azerbaijan has an embassy in Kyiv. Ukraine has an embassy in Baku. Both countries are full members of the Council of Europe, the Organization for Security and Co-operation in Europe (OSCE), Eastern Partnership, Organization of the Black Sea Economic Cooperation (BSEC) as well as GUAM.

=== High-level visits ===
Guest	Host	Place of visit	Date of visit	Notes
(Azerbaijan) President Abulfaz Elchibey	(Ukraine) President Leonid Kravchuk	Kyiv	12 November 1992	
(Ukraine) President Leonid Kuchma	(Azerbaijan) President Heydar Aliyev	Baku	26–28 July 1995	
(Azerbaijan) President Heydar Aliyev	(Ukraine) President Leonid Kuchma	Kyiv	24–25 March 1997	During the meeting, Aliyev was awarded with the Order of Prince Yaroslav the Wise.
(Azerbaijan) President Heydar Aliyev	(Ukraine) President Leonid Kuchma	Kyiv	3 November 1999	Took part at the inauguration ceremony of Kuchma.
(Ukraine) President Leonid Kuchma	(Azerbaijan) President Heydar Aliyev	Baku	16–17 March 2000	As a result of the visit, Aliyev presented Kuchma with the Istiglal Order.
(Azerbaijan) President Ilham Aliyev	(Ukraine) President Leonid Kuchma	Kyiv	3-4 June 2004	
(Azerbaijan) President Ilham Aliyev	(Ukraine) President Leonid Kuchma	Kyiv	27-28 October 2004	Took part in the 60th Anniversary of the Liberation of Ukraine.
(Azerbaijan) President Ilham Aliyev	(Ukraine) President Viktor Yushchenko	Kyiv	22 April 2005	
(Azerbaijan) President Ilham Aliyev	(Ukraine) President Viktor Yushchenko	Kyiv	16-17 June 2005	
(Azerbaijan) President Ilham Aliyev	(Ukraine) President Viktor Yushchenko	Kyiv	22-23 May 2006	
(Ukraine) President Viktor Yushchenko	(Azerbaijan) President Ilham Aliyev	Baku	7-8 September 2006	
(Ukraine) President Viktor Yushchenko	(Azerbaijan) President Ilham Aliyev	Baku	18-19 June 2007	
(Azerbaijan) President Ilham Aliyev	(Ukraine) President Viktor Yushchenko	Kyiv	21-23 May 2008	
(Ukraine) President Viktor Yushchenko	(Azerbaijan) President Ilham Aliyev	Baku	30 June-1 July 2008	
(Ukraine) President Viktor Yushchenko	(Azerbaijan) President Ilham Aliyev	Baku	13-14 November 2008	
(Ukraine) President Viktor Yushchenko	(Azerbaijan) President Ilham Aliyev	Baku	9-10 April 2009	
(Azerbaijan) President Ilham Aliyev	(Ukraine) President Viktor Yanukovych	Kyiv	10-11 October 2010	
(Ukraine) President Viktor Yanukovych	(Azerbaijan) President Ilham Aliyev	Baku	28–29 April 2011	
(Ukraine) President Viktor Yanukovych	(Azerbaijan) President Ilham Aliyev	Baku	12 December 2012	
(Azerbaijan) President Ilham Aliyev	(Ukraine) President Viktor Yanukovych	Kyiv	17-18 November 2013	
(Ukraine) President Petro Poroshenko	(Azerbaijan) President Ilham Aliyev	Baku	13–14 July 2016	
(Ukraine) President Volodymyr Zelenskyy	(Azerbaijan) President Ilham Aliyev	Baku	17–18 December 2019	During the visit, Zelenskyy had a one-on-one meeting with the President of Azerbaijan Ilham Aliyev after which they hold negotiations in an expanded format. Following the expanded meeting, the sides signed bilateral documents such as Protocol of Intent between Ganja and Odesa, an Agreement on trade, economic, scientific, technical, and cultural cooperation between Guba and Truskavets, Agreement on cooperation between the Ministry of Economy of Azerbaijan and the State Regulatory Service of Ukraine on the conditions of doing business. Ukrainian President also met with the Prime Minister Ali Asadov, took part in the Ukrainian-Azerbaijani Business Forum, visited the Ukrainian Cultural and Educational Center of Baku Slavic University and met with representatives of Ukrainian community in Azerbaijan.
(Azerbaijan) President Ilham Aliyev	(Ukraine) President Volodymyr Zelenskyy	Kyiv	14 January 2022	
(Ukraine) President Volodymyr Zelenskyy	(Azerbaijan) President Ilham Aliyev	Baku	25 April 2026	During the visit, Zelenskyy the first visit since the outbreak of 2022 Russo-Ukrainian war.

== Economic relations ==
In the post-Soviet space, Ukraine has been considered the second most important trade partner of Azerbaijan after the Russian Federation. Ukraine is one of the main import partners of Azerbaijan, and Azerbaijan grants Ukraine exclusive conditions for oil supply. Main goods imported from Ukraine to Azerbaijan remains as mainly metallurgy products, machine-building products, agro-industrial products, and chemical industry products. While main goods exported from Azerbaijan to Ukraine are generally Products of the fuel energy industry, chemical industry products, and agro-industrial products.

The trade turnover between the two countries reached $1.4 billion in 2010. According to the reports of the Azerbaijani State Customs Committee, the transactions between them amounted to $343.87 million during the first period of 2018, and $146.57 million was made by the Azerbaijan side as a result of its exports. The trade turnover between Azerbaijan and Ukraine in January 2019 exceeded $74 million, about half in each direction. The volume of trade started to shift upward in 2005 and amounted to approximately $1.5 billion in 2011 (the highest point). During this period Azerbaijan gained $909 million, Ukraine retained $558 million by mutual trade partnership, respectively. Nevertheless, starting from 2012, the trade turnover between them, worsened and declined below the statistics of 2011. The situation only changed between 2016 and 2017 so that trade volume rose up to $800 million from $300. In 2018, the number of transactions between Azerbaijan and Ukraine amounted to about $829 million that was around $18 million compared to 2017. In that year, Azerbaijan import imported approximately $469 million worth of products and while exported $358 million 738 thousand worth of products to Ukraine. So, the Azerbaijani side had current account surpluses while Ukraine had a current account deficit. Moreover, the direct investments from Ukraine to Azerbaijan amounted to more than $25 million, and from Azerbaijan to Ukraine was around $200 million. As a result of improvements in economic cooperation between Azerbaijan and Ukraine, the first Trade House of Azerbaijan was opened in the capital of Ukraine, and similar projects are estimated to be implemented in the other regions of Ukraine. The Azerbaijan Trade House has been launched to deal with promote “Made in Azerbaijan” brand in the Ukrainian market, and also it is expected to promote the general exports of the products of Azerbaijan.

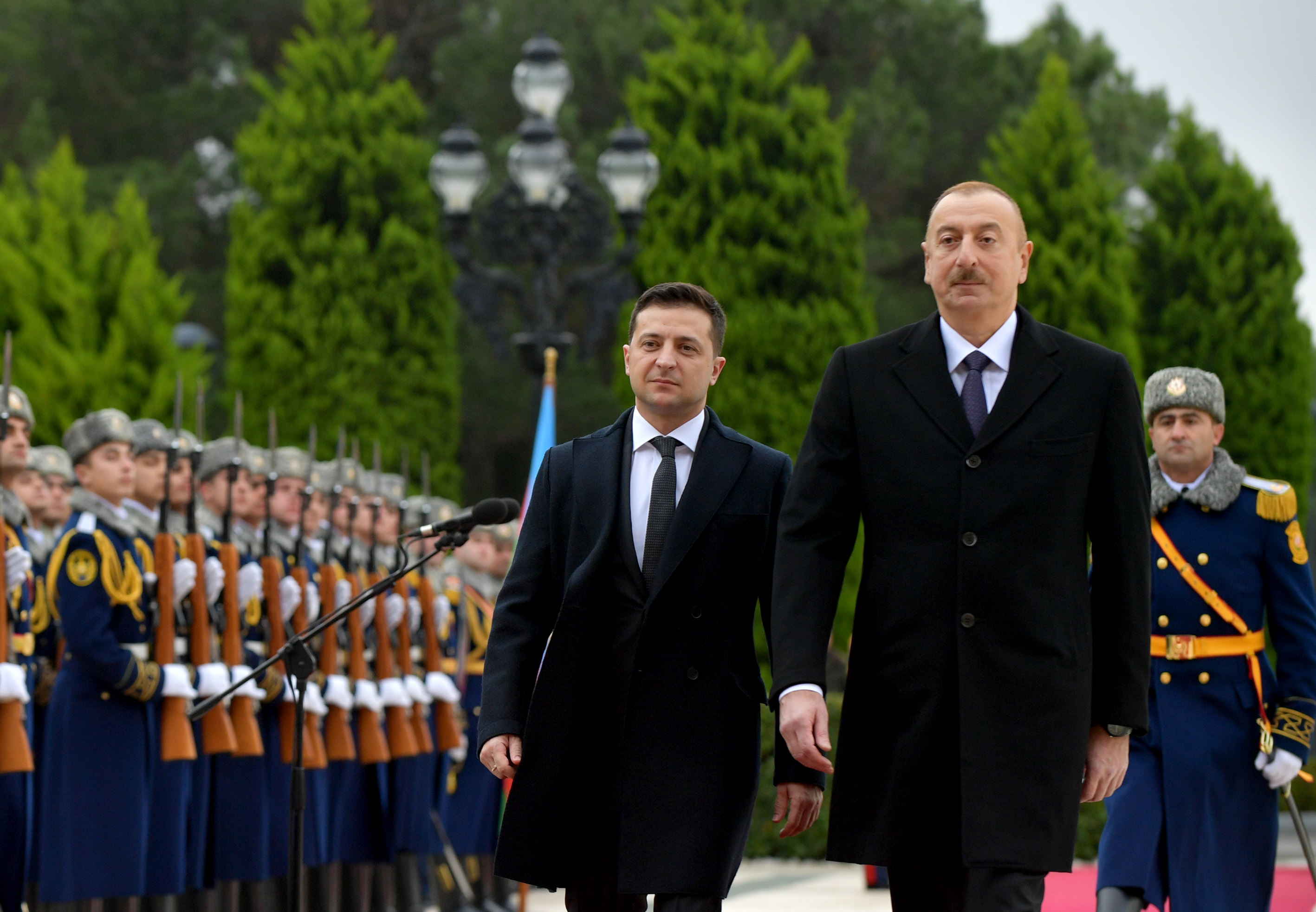
Volodymyr Zelenskyy and Ilham Aliyev 2019

The State Oil Company of Azerbaijan Republic (SOCAR) is considered one of the key players to increase transactions between Azerbaijan and Ukraine. So as a result of its investments in Ukraine, it has 9 petrol filling stations in Odesa and Mykolaiv regions of Ukraine, and in capital Kyiv and has further plan to establish more petrol filling stations in various regions of the country.

Additionally, in 2009, SOCAR purchased the Naftonreyd oil base in that country which has the 25,250 m3 and an annual turnover of 200 thousand m3.

=== Imports and exports ===
Imports of Azerbaijan
Year	Amount Thousands of USD
2020	418 455,13
2021	470 024,16 ▲
2022	259 804,61▼
2023	235 128,77 ▼
2024	282 377,70 ▲
2025	282 737,07 ▲

Exports of Azerbaijan
Year	Amount Thousands of USD
2020	353 045,37
2021	452 449,32 ▲
2022	357 974,81 ▼
2023	118 645,80 ▼
2024	177 242,23 ▲
2025	227 936,54 ▲

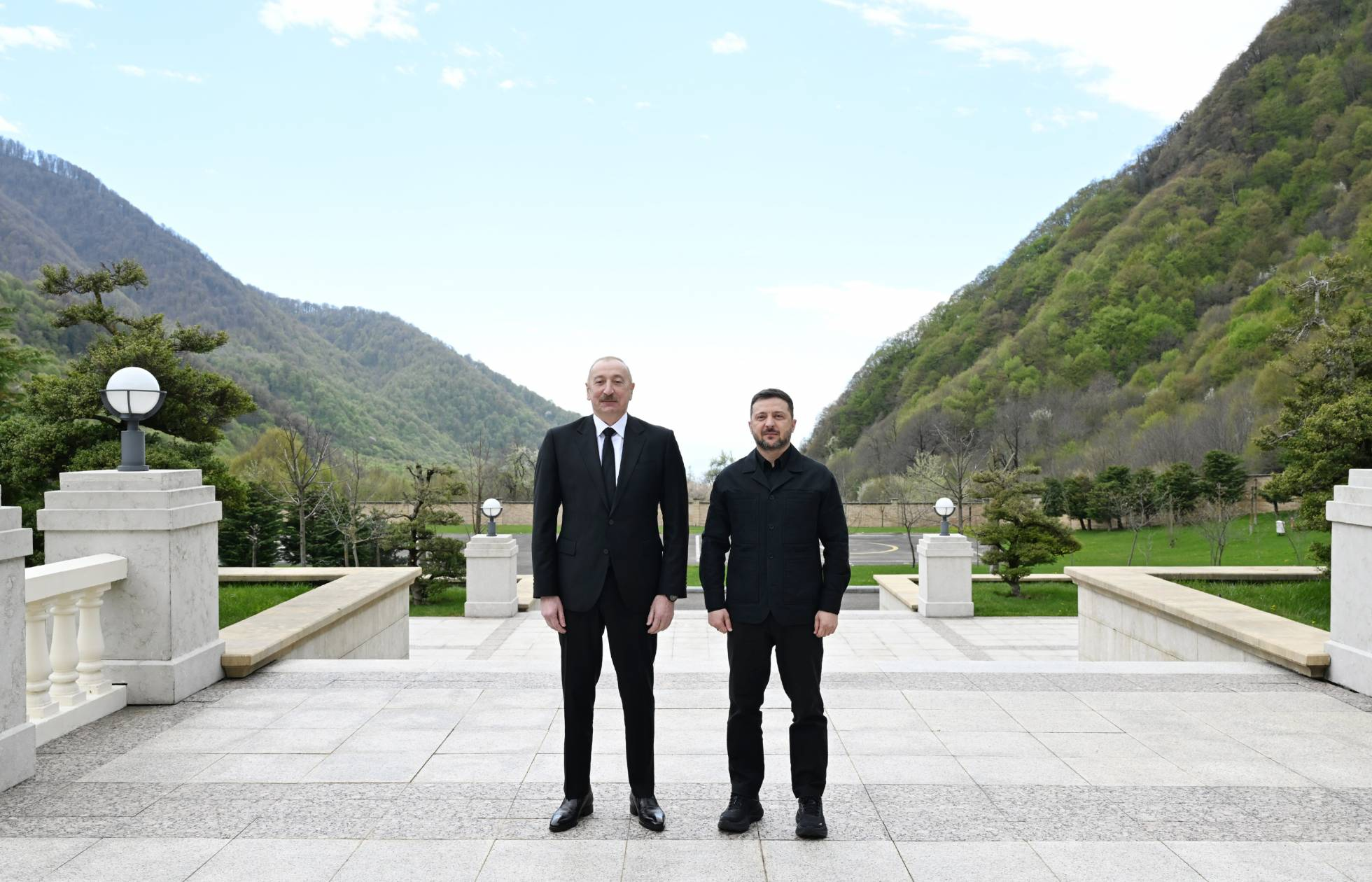
Volodymyr Zelenskyy and Ilham Aliyev Qabala April 2026

== Military cooperation ==
Ukraine is, after Turkey and Israel, one of the main military partners of Azerbaijan. Azeri officers are trained in Ukrainian military academies, and various technical assistance is supplied by Ukraine. In 2006, Ukraine had sold 48 T-72AG to Azerbaijan. In 2009, Ukraine supplied to Azerbaijan, 29 BTR-70, 29 units of 122-millimeter self-propelled howitzers 2S1 Pink and 6 units of 152-millimeter self-propelled howitzers 2S3 Acacia a combat trainer MiG-29UB, 11 Mi-24. In 2010, Ukraine sold to Azerbaijan a 71 BTR-70, 7 self-propelled artillery "Carnation" 2S1 122 mm, 1 Mi-24P, a managed anti-missile complex, and 3,000 rifles and pistols. Ukraine remains as one of the main military partners of Azerbaijan.

One month before the 2022 Russian invasion of Ukraine, Azerbaijan transferred three MiG-29 to a Ukrainian facility for repairs.

== Cultural relations ==

Since 1998, Ukrainian has been taught in Baku Slavic University and the Ukrainian sector opened afterward. In 2001 in Kyiv, the Heydar Aliyev Social and Political Science Institutes was opened. Since 1978 a library named Samed Vurgun is active in Ukraine. At the same year, a short documentary called Azerbaijani days in Ukraine released and year after From the eyes of the friends documentary was shot which was about the Ukrainian culture days in Azerbaijan. Monument of Taras Shevchenko was opened in Azerbaijan in 2008.

In 2000 there were about 32,000 Ukrainians that lived in Azerbaijan, and over 45,000 Azerbaijanis that lived in Ukraine. Azerbaijan recognizes the Holodomor as a genocide.

== Resident diplomatic missions ==
- Azerbaijan has an embassy in Kyiv.
- Ukraine has an embassy in Baku.
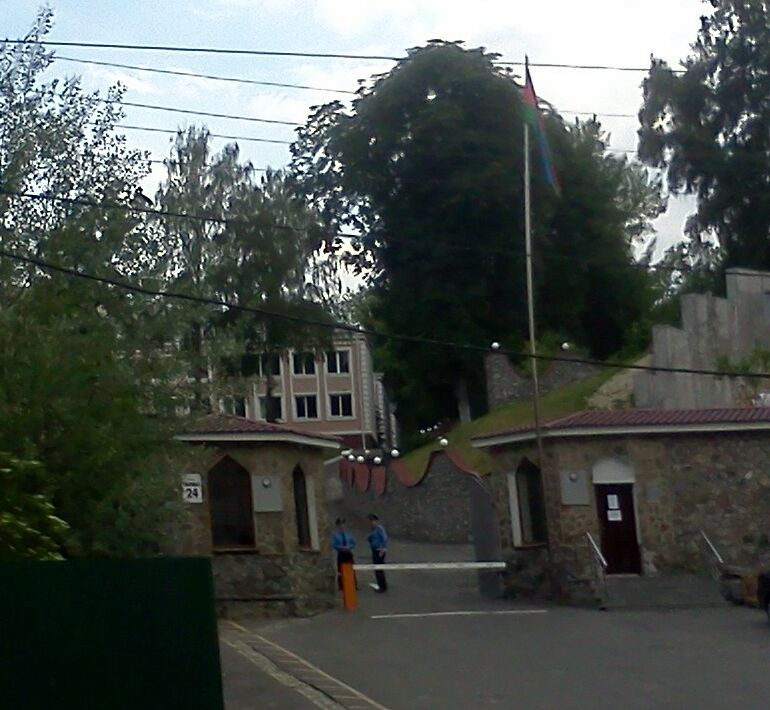
Embassy of Azerbaijan in Kyiv

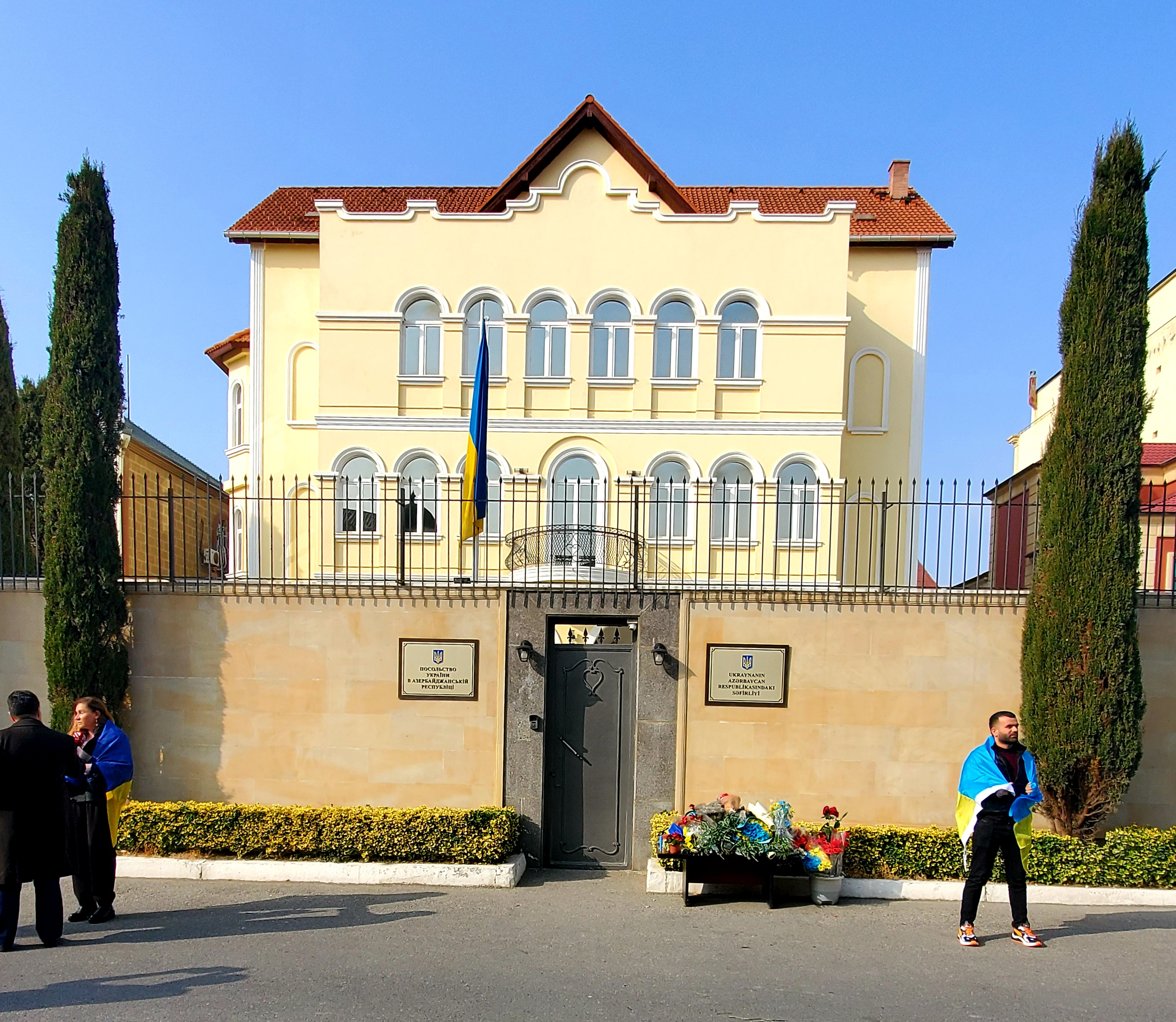
Embassy of Ukraine in Baku

== See also ==
- Foreign relations of Azerbaijan
- Foreign relations of Ukraine
- Azerbaijanis in Ukraine
- Ukrainians in Azerbaijan
