= Monument to Taras Shevchenko (Baku) =

- Azerbaijani: Taras Şevçenkonun heykəli
- 40°23′23″N 49°50′32″E
- Location: Baku, Azerbaijan
- Designer: Igor Grechanik
- Type: Memorial
- Material: bronze
- Height: 3.5 m
- Opening date: June 30, 2008
- Dedicated to: Taras Shevchenko

The Monument to Taras Shevchenko (Azerbaijani: Taras Şevçenkonun heykəli) is a monument to the Ukrainian poet and writer Taras Shevchenko raised in the capital of Azerbaijan, the city of Baku. The author of the monument is the Ukrainian sculptor Igor Grechanik.

== History ==
The idea of making the monument belongs to a group of authors led by the Ukrainian sculptor Igor Grechanik. This bronze monument differs from many other monuments to Taras Shevchenko, in particular from those of the Soviet era. The authors of the sculpture moved away from the traditional image of the poet and presented him being young. This is how Shevchenko looked when he wrote his book "Kobzar" (the first edition came out when he was 26 years old), which was also depicted on the monument.

The square on which the monument was raised was completely reconstructed by the Baku City Hall according to the project of the Baku architect, Goncha Manafova, and Akif Abdulaev, the chief architect of Baku. The creation and delivery of the monument to the city was fully financed by the philanthropist Sergei Bondarchuk.

The monument was inaugurated on 30 June 2008. The opening ceremony was attended by the President of Azerbaijan, Ilham Aliyev, and the President of Ukraine, Viktor Yushchenko.

== Description ==
The monument is made of bronze, making 3.5 meters high. Taras Shevchenko is captured young and transmitting to people his work - "Kobzar", and is illuminated by the wing of God's gift of inspiration and the spiritual take-off. Here he acts as "the prophet of the Ukrainian nation who gave to the people the word of truth". On the reverse side, the monument resembles a willow tree with roots - the personification of Ukraine and the folk source - the origins of Taras Shevchenko.
