= Ihor Haidai =

Ukrainian photo artist

- Ігор Гайдай
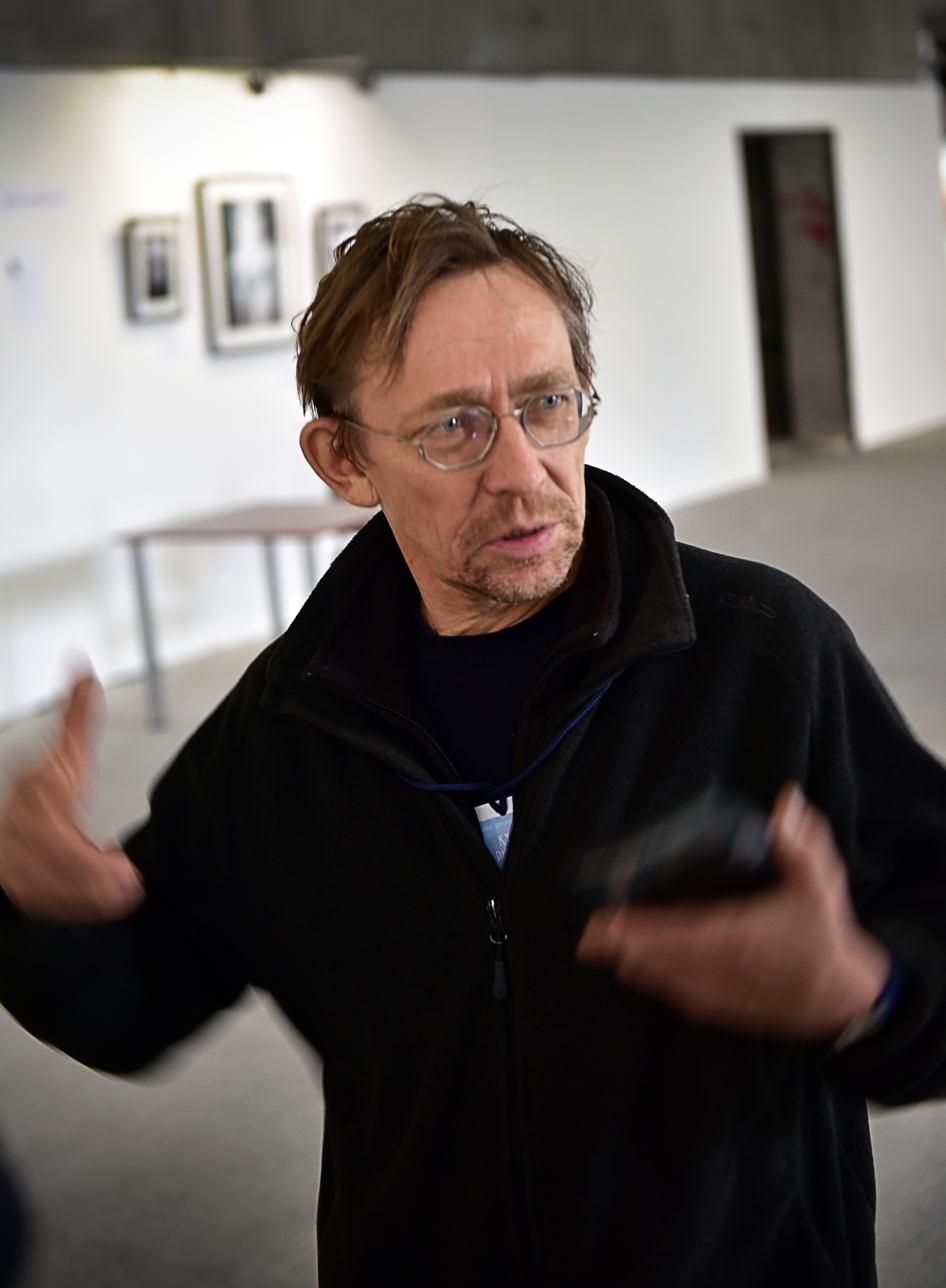
- Born: January 22, 1961 (age 65); Kharkiv, Ukrainian SSR
- Education: Kyiv I. K. Karpenko-Kary Theater Institute (1985)
- Website: photogaidai.com

Ihor Mykolaiovych Haidai (Ukrainian: Ігор Миколайович Гайдай born January 22, 1961, in Kharkiv) is a Ukrainian photo artist and one of the founders of the National Union of Photographers of Ukraine.

== Biography ==
In 1985, he graduated from the Kyiv I. K. Karpenko-Kary Theater Institute with a degree in cinematography. Igor Gaidai's graduation project was the short film "Dragon" (based on the novel of the same name by Ray Bradbury), which won an award at the Kyiv International Film Festival "Molodist" (1984).

He worked as a teacher of photo composition and lighting at the Department of Film Directing at the Kyiv I. К. Karpenko-Kary Institute (1984-1986), and as a photographer at the Dovzhenko Film Studios (1987—1991). Until 2002, he worked with many advertising agencies.

In May 2023, Haidal's unique photograph "Soldiers of the Azov Regiment. Mariupol" was sold for $12,500 at a charity auction at the National Center Ukrainian House.

Since July 28, 2023, he has been a member of the Taras Shevchenko National Prize Committee.

== Creativity ==
In 1991, he founded his own photo studio. Since 1995, he has been the founder, co-owner and art director of Gaidai Studio LLC.

He has written the photo books "Ukrainians: The beginning of the third millennium" (2003), "9 months + 3 days" (2008), "Razom.ua" (2011)

Solo exhibitions have occurred in Heinsberg (1991), Toulouse (1993, 2008), Kyiv (1994, 2001, 2003, 2005, 2006, 2007, 2008, 2009, 2010, 2011, 2012, 2013, 2014, 2015, 2018, 2019), Leipzig (1996), Wrocław (2004), Geneva (2005), Vienna (2006, 2009), Donetsk (2008), Dnipropetrovs'k (2008), Lviv (2009, 2011, 2014), Minsk (2009), Arles (2010, 2011), Paris (2010, 2013), London (2011, 2014), Metz (2011, 2013), Angers (2011), Moscow (2013), Berlin (2014), Pärnu (2014), New York (2014), Zaporizhzhia (2014), Chernivtsi (2014), Chernihiv (2014), Ivano-Frankivsk (2015), Hofburg (2015), Innsbruck (2015, 2020), Grunewald (2015), Frankfurt/Oder (2015), Odesa (2021), Kutaisi (2022), Strasbourg (2022).
