= European Square (Kyiv) =

Square in Kyiv, Ukraine

Coordinates: 50°27′8″N 30°31′39″E

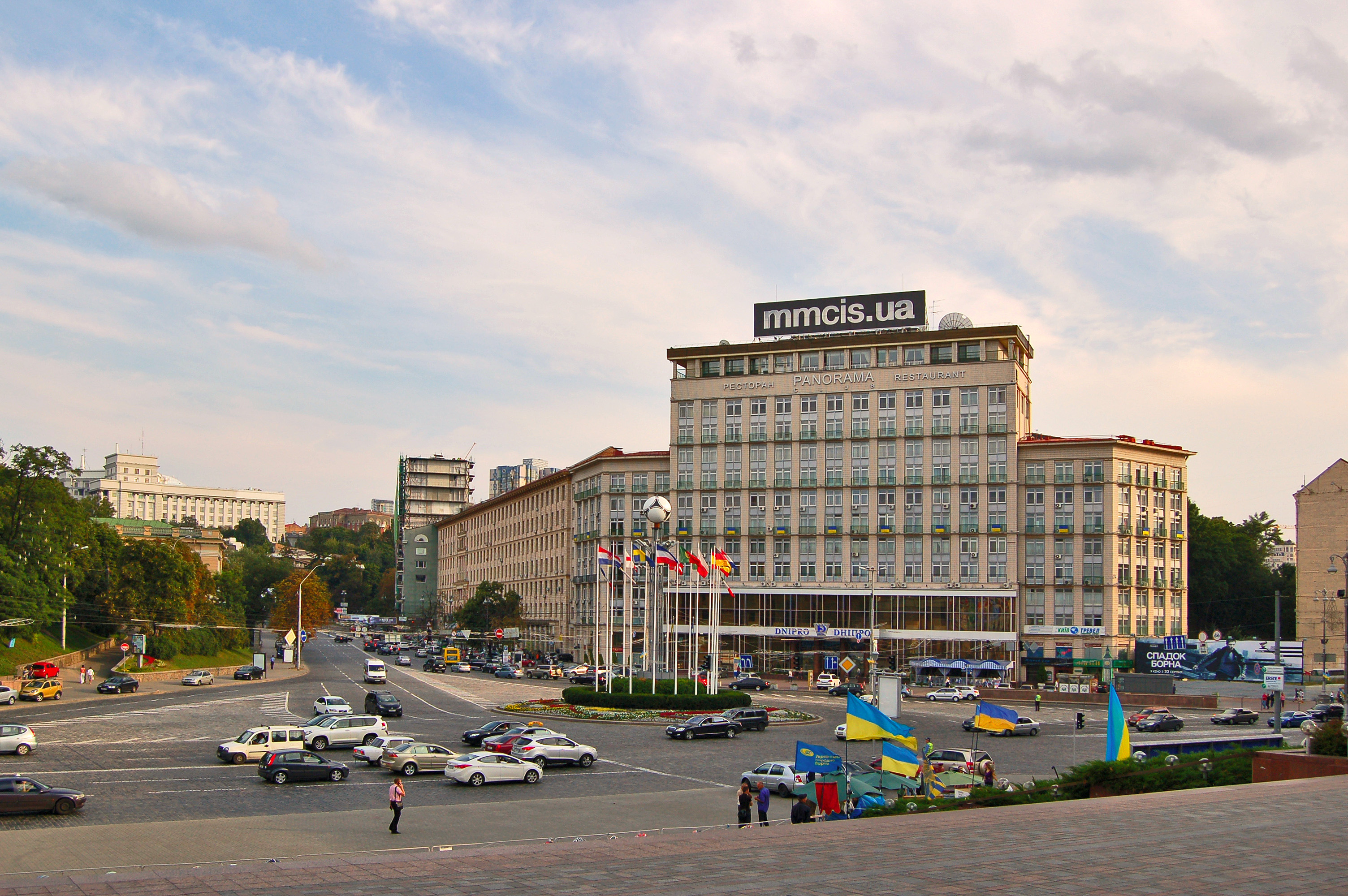
European Square and the Hotel Dnipro.

European Square (Ukrainian: Європейська площа, romanized: Yevropeiska ploshcha, pronounced [jeu̯roˈpɛjsʲkɐ ˈplɔʃtʃɐ]) is a square located in what is known as the Old Town (Stare Misto) or the Upper Town, in Kyiv, the capital of Ukraine. It is also located at the north-eastern end of the Khreschatyk, the city's main thoroughfare. Other streets connected to the square are Tryokhsvyatytelska Street, Volodymyrskyi Descent, and Hrushevsky Street.

In 2013–14 the square was one of the centres of the EuroMaidan protests.

== Former names ==
The square was known under at least nine different names during the last two hundred years.

- Originally, the square was called the Horse's Square (Konnaya Ploschad), because its location was used for horse trading.
- 1806 - Theatre Square (Teatralnaya Ploschad), after the 1805–1806 construction of the first theater in Kyiv by the architect Andriy Melensky located at the current place of Ukrainian House.
- 1851 - European Square (Yevropeyskaya Ploschad), when the Yevropeysky Hotel was built to the designs of the architect Alexander Vikentievich Beretti.
- 1869 - Tsar Square (Tsarskaya Ploschad, due to the monument of Alexander II of Russia erected there). During that time the square was also referred to as Aleksandrovskaya for the same reason and because through it was passing ulitsa Aleksandrovskaya (today split Mykhailo Hrushevsky Street, Volodymyr Descent, and Petro Sahaidachny Street).
- 1919 - Third International's Square (Ploschad Tretieva Internatsionala), after the Soviet occupation of Ukraine.
- 1941 - Adolf Hitler Square (Adolf Hitler Platz), German occupation
- 1944 - Stalin Square (Stalinskaya Ploschad), Soviet return
- 1961 - Lenin's Komsomol Square (Ploschad Leninskava Komsomola), destalinization process

== Attractions ==
- Hotel Dnipro
- UNIAN news agency building
- Ukrainian House (Ukrainskyi Dim) conference and exhibitions hall originally built in the late 1970s as a Lenin Museum
- Khreshchatyi Park
  - Kyiv Philharmonic (19th-century building)
  - Parliamentary Library of Ukraine building
  - Bridge over Saint Volodymyr Descent pedestrian and bicycle bridge

== Streets ==
List of streets that connect to the square.

- Hrushevsky Street (Kyiv)
- Khreshchatyk
- Saint Volodymyr Descent
- Three-Saints Street
- Peter's Alley

== Gallery ==
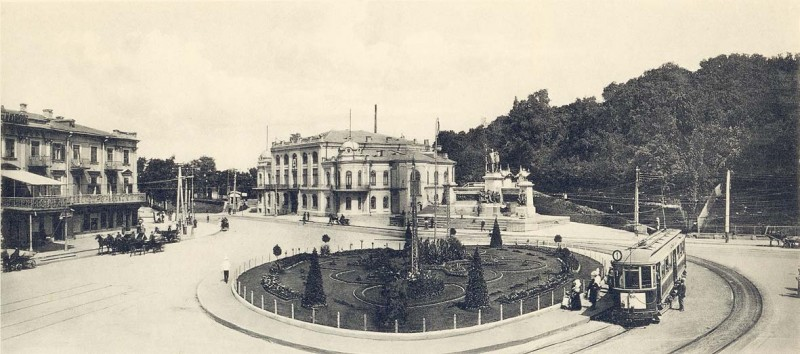
Square in 1911
