= Saint Volodymyr Hill =

Park in Kyiv, Ukraine

Coordinates: 50°27′24.38″N 30°31′34.68″E

- Володимирська гірка
- Володимирська гірка
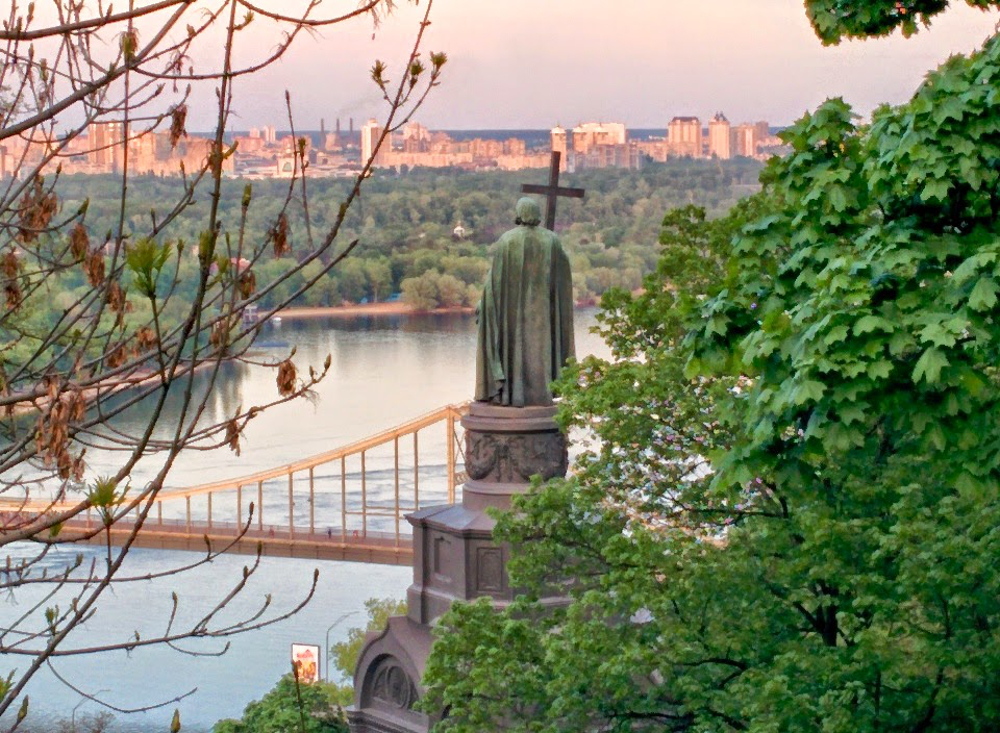
- View of Saint Volodymyr Hill and the monument to St. Volodymyr, erected in 1853

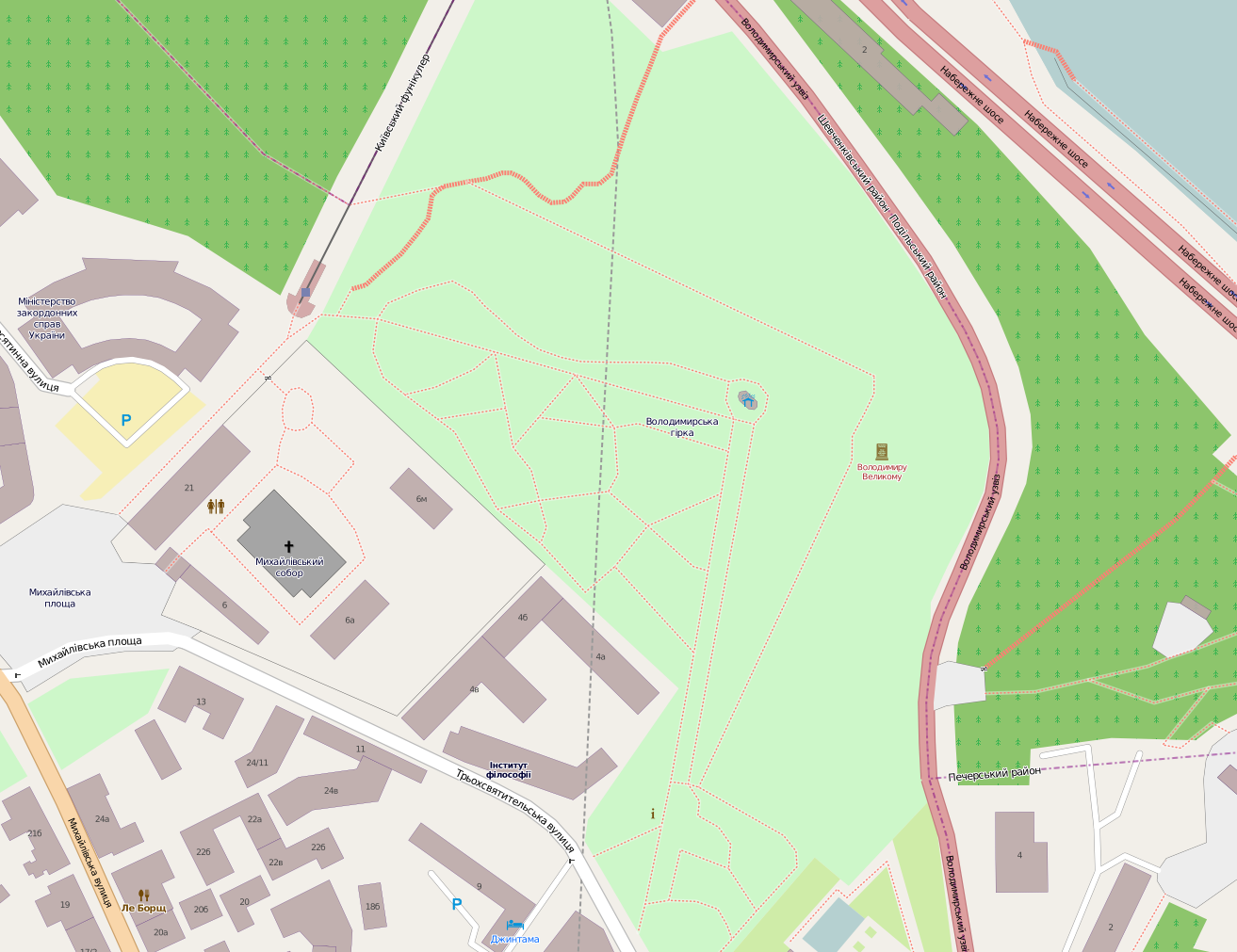
- Location of the park in Kyiv
- Type: public park
- Location: Shevchenko Raion, Kyiv, Ukraine
- Area: 10.6 hectares (26 acres)
- Created: 1850s

The Volodymyrska Hill or Saint Volodymyr Hill (Ukrainian: «Володимирська гірка», romanized: "Volodymyrska hirka") is a large 10.6 hectares (0.106 km^{2}) park located on the steep right-bank of the Dnipro River in central Kyiv, the capital of Ukraine. Its most famous and prominent landmark is the Monument to Prince Volodymyr. The monument, with its prominent location and overlooking the scenic panorama of the left-bank of Kyiv, has since become one of the symbols of Kyiv, often depicted in paintings and photographic works of the city. The Hill provides an excellent panorama of the Dinpro River, the Left Bank, and Podil.

== History ==
The first historical reference to Volodymyr Hill was in the Primary Chronicles of Kyivan Rus, where it describes Sviatopolk II of Kyiv building the St. Michael's Golden-Domed Cathedral in 1108. The hill, on which the cathedral was built, was a citadel within the ancient part of Kyiv, built by and named after Iziaslav I of Kyiv.

Volodymyrska Hill park was established in the mid-19th century, its name reflecting the Monument to Prince Volodymyr which was erected in 1853 in the park.

Volodymyrska Hill originally only referred to a park located at the highest and middle terraces of the historic St. Michael's Hill, which was named after St. Michael's Golden-Domed Cathedral and Monastery. However, the name "St. Michael's Hill" went into decline after destruction of the cathedral and the renaming of local streets by the Soviet regime in the 1930s.

Construction of the terraces as they appear today started in the 1840s. Volodymyrska Hill park became the first free-of-charge public park in Kyiv.

== Other landmarks ==
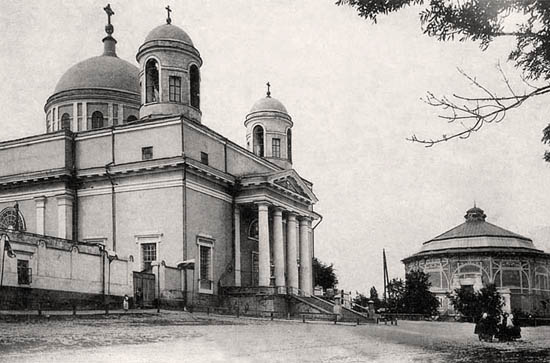
St Alexander's Church, with the Golgotha pavilion on the right, beginning of 20 century

In 1902 at the upper part of the terrace next to Saint Alexander's Church, a pavilion with a Golgotha panorama was opened, though this was destroyed in 1935 by the Soviet regime.

A street which passes through the park's hilly landscape on the eastern side is the cobblestone Saint Volodymyr Descent. At the park's northern end, the Kyiv Funicular serves (mostly for tourists) as a transport connection between Kyiv's Upper Town neighborhood and the historic commercial district of Podil. As an alternative to the funicular, and adjoining it, is a long staircase. Across the funicular tracks to the north a park zone extends onto the Old Kyiv Hill which separates the Upper city (Old Kyiv) from the Lower city (Podil). Ukrainian House is located near the park's southern border by the Three Saints Street (vulytsia Tryokhsvyatytelska). In the same vicinity is located the Institute of Philosophy.

A feature of the park is a wrought-iron gazebo which was installed in 1899 through the sponsorship of a rich Moscow merchant and oil magnate Vasily Kokorev, who was very much impressed by Kyiv's beauty. This gazebo soon became the favorite spot of meetings and rendezvous.

Since 2019, a glass pedestrian bridge has connected the park with Khreshchatyi Park.

== Gallery ==
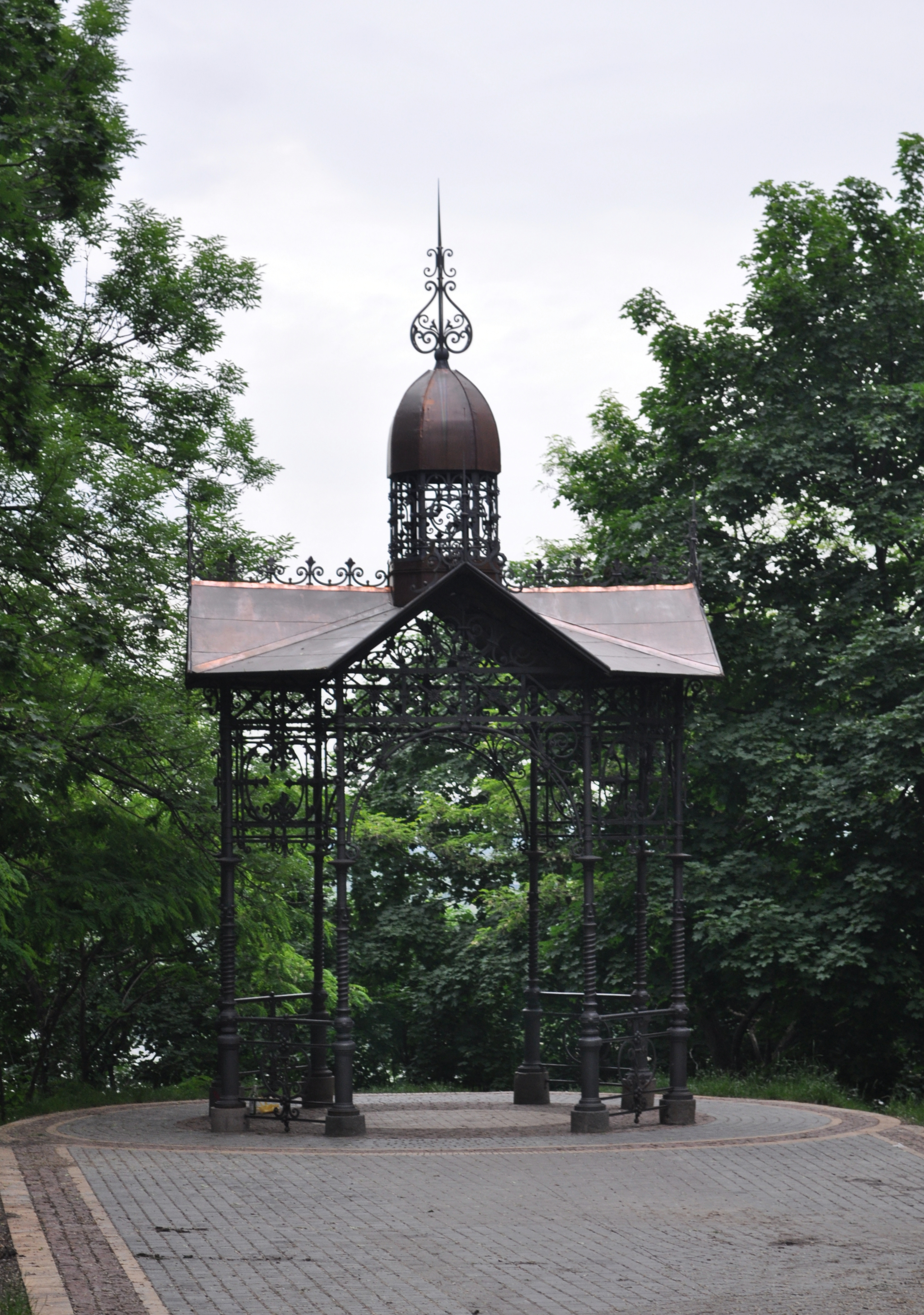
The Kokorev gazebo

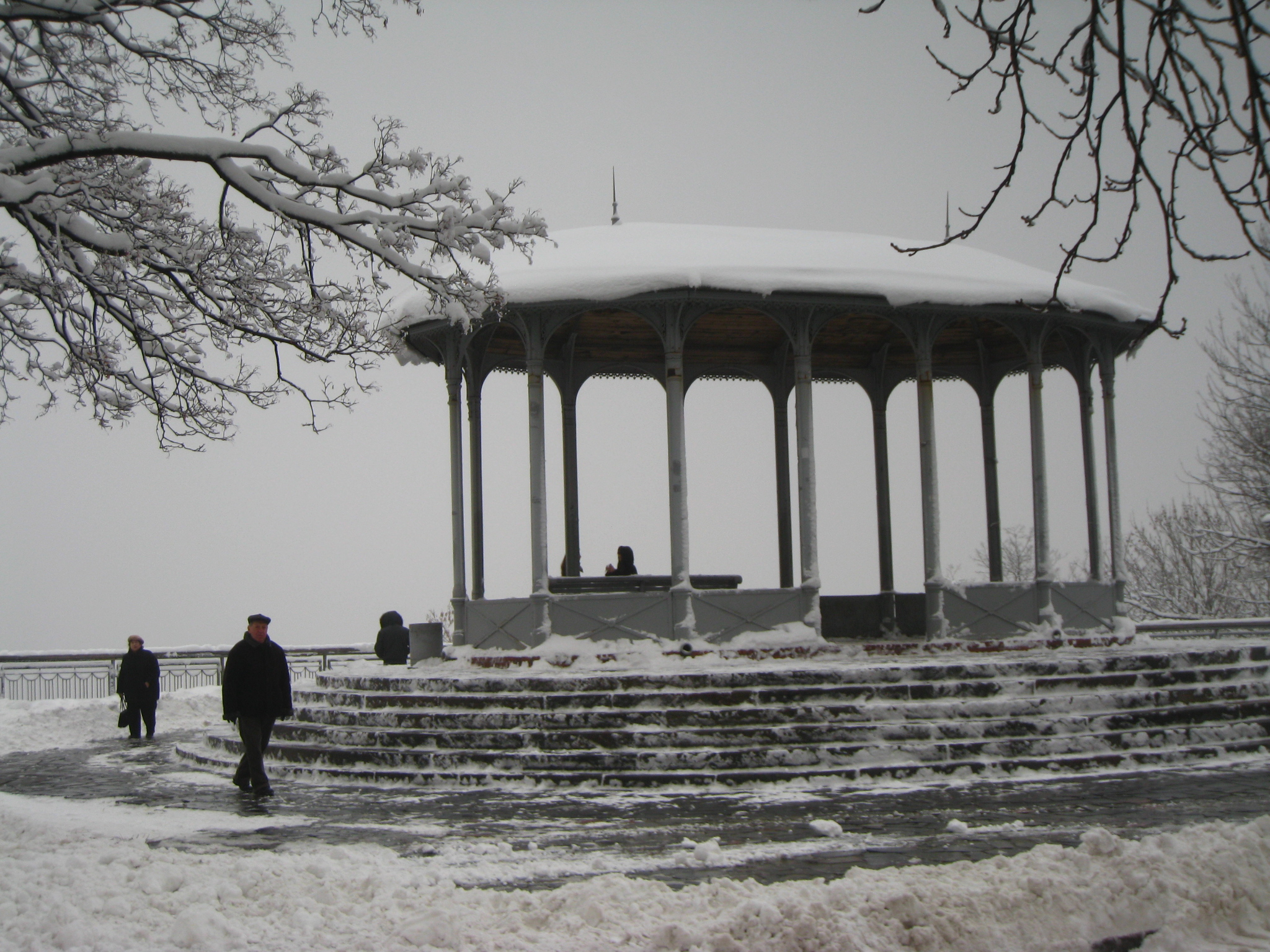
Gazebo in the central part of Volodymyrska Hill

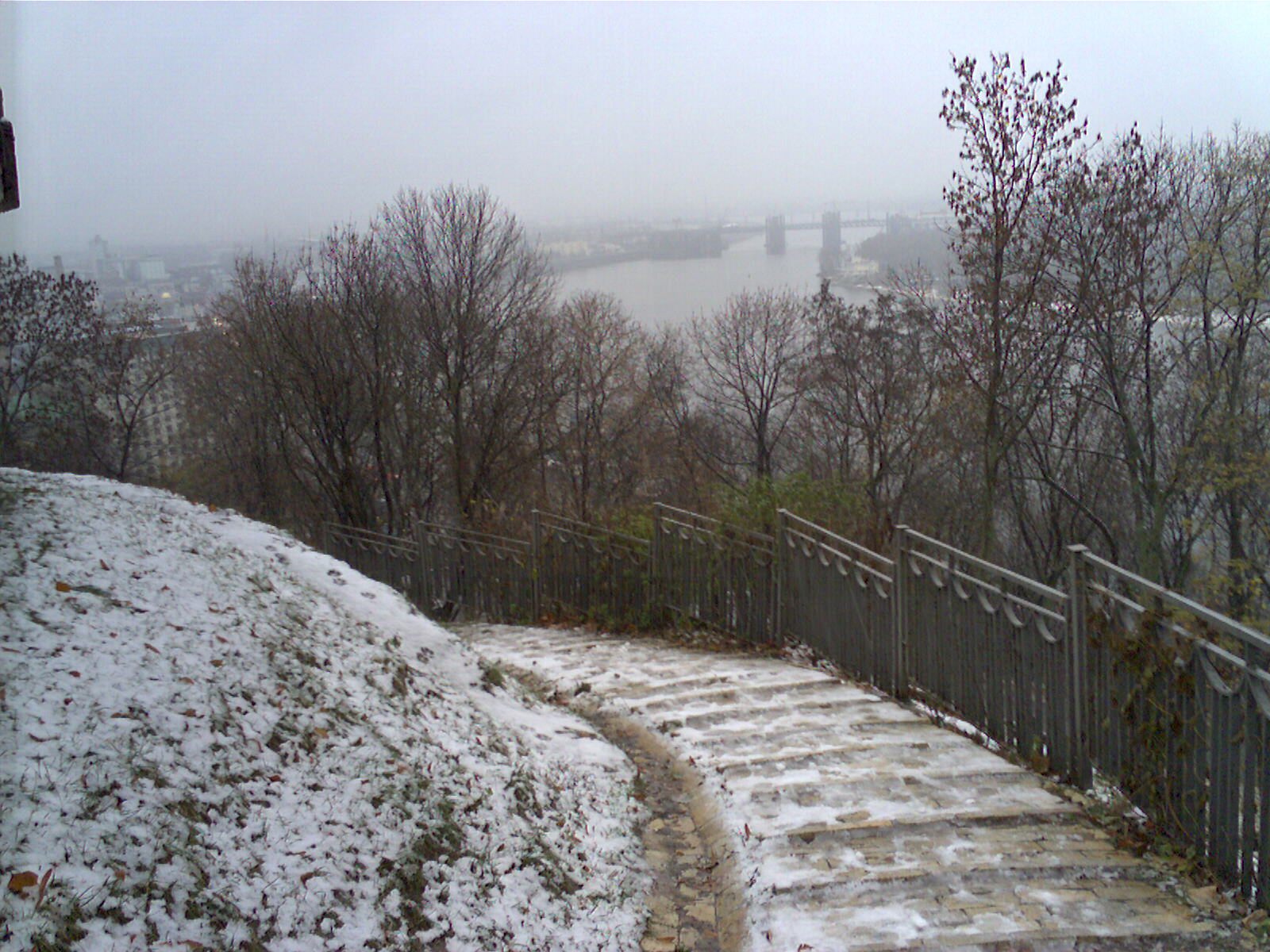

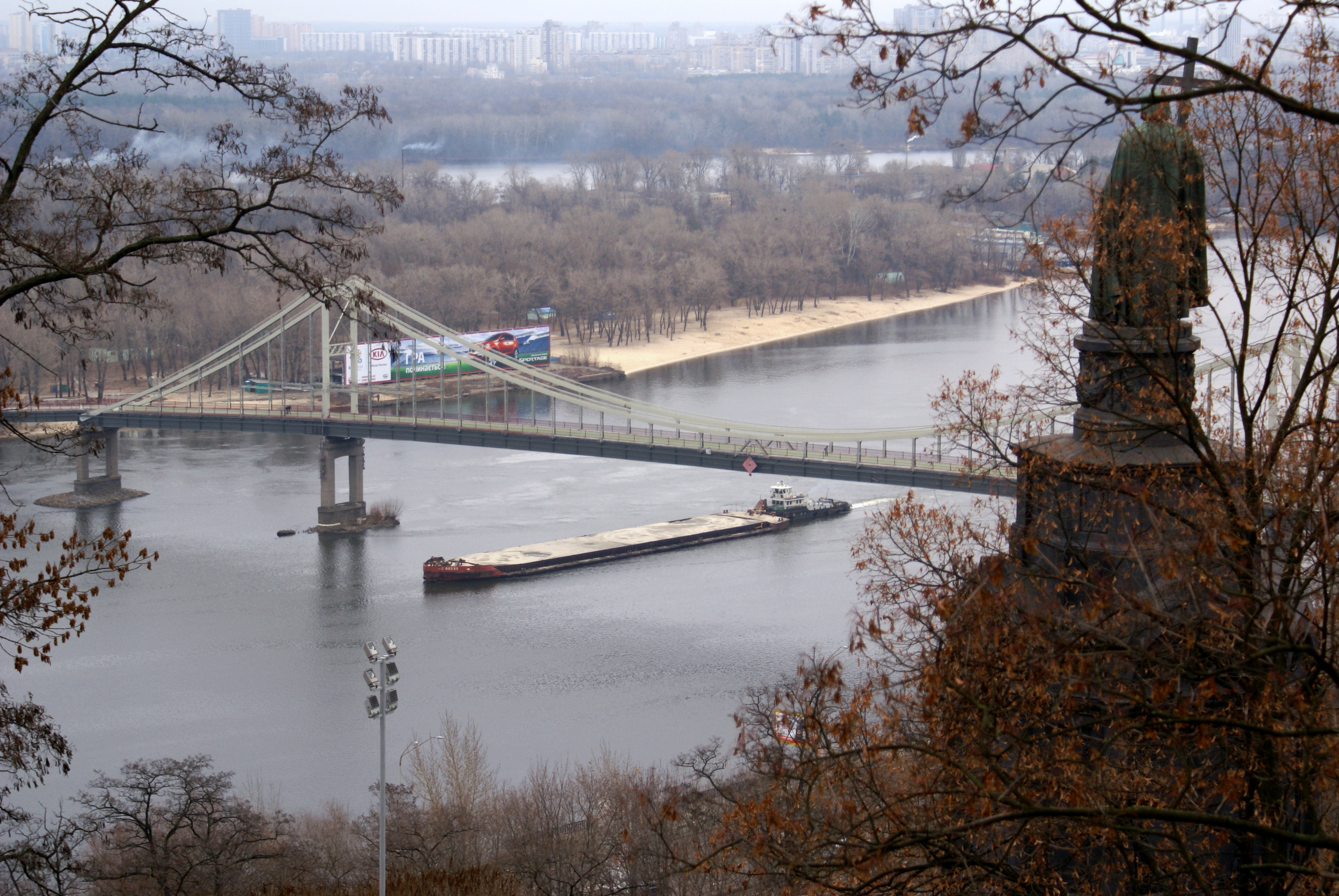

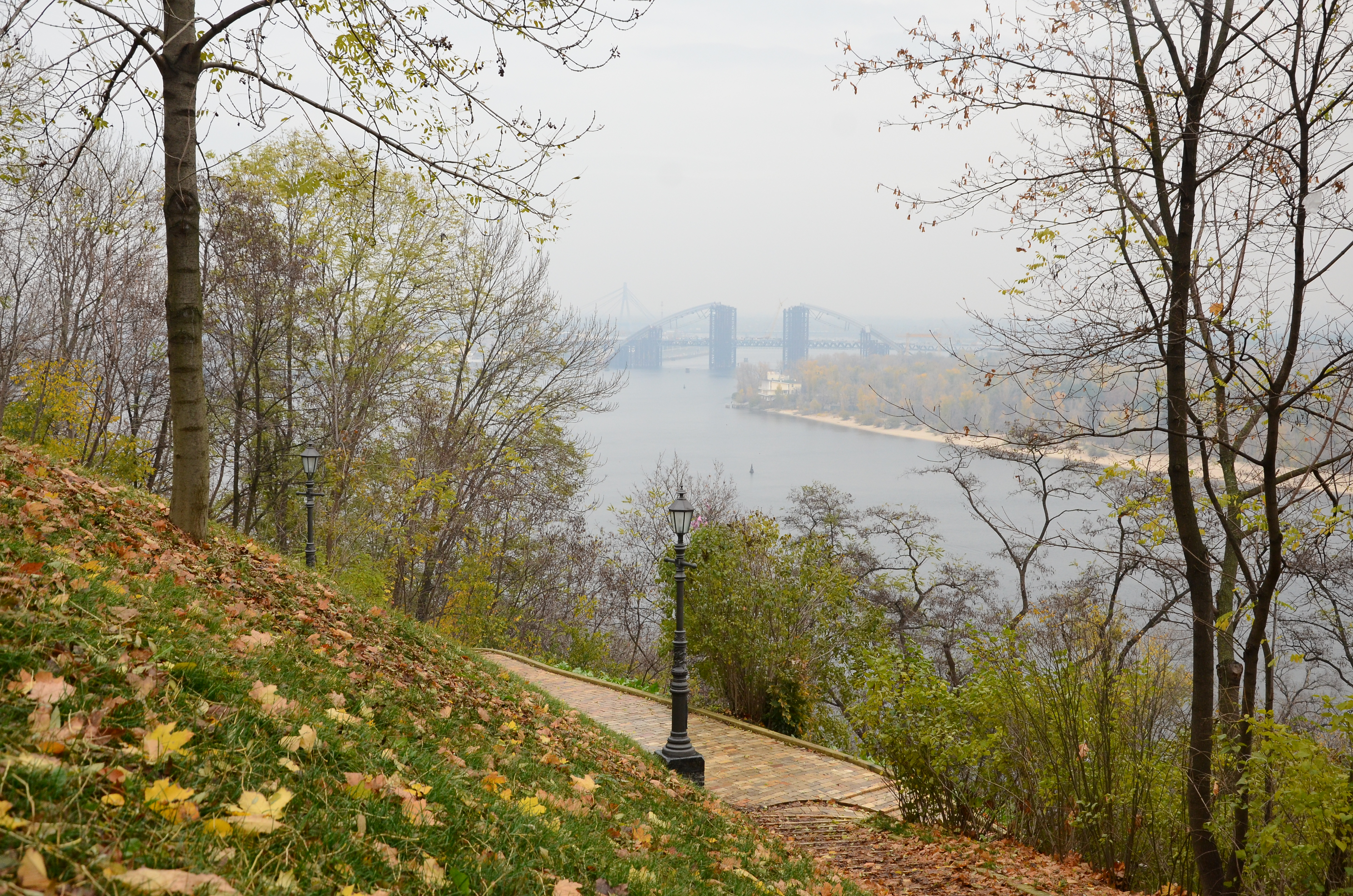

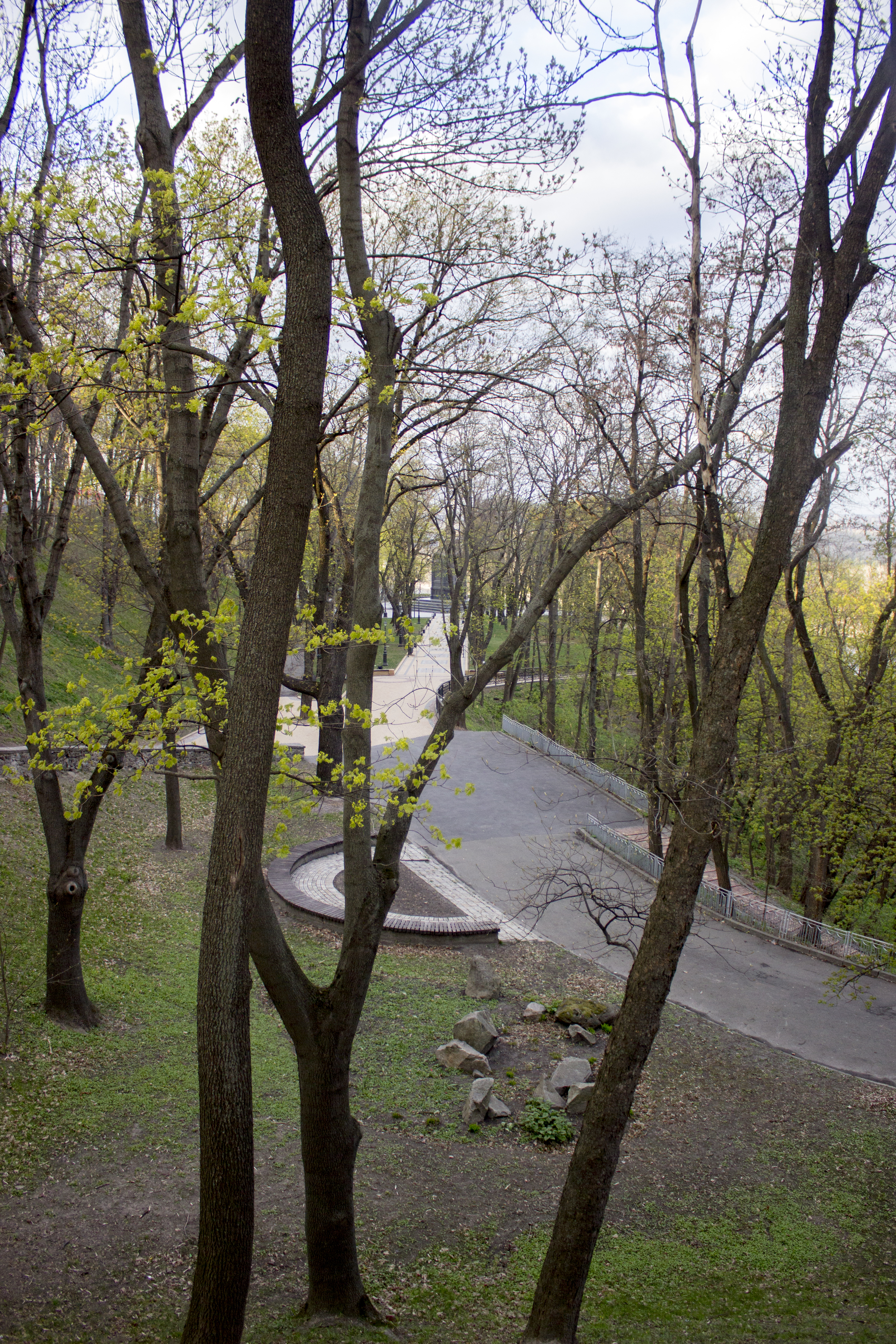

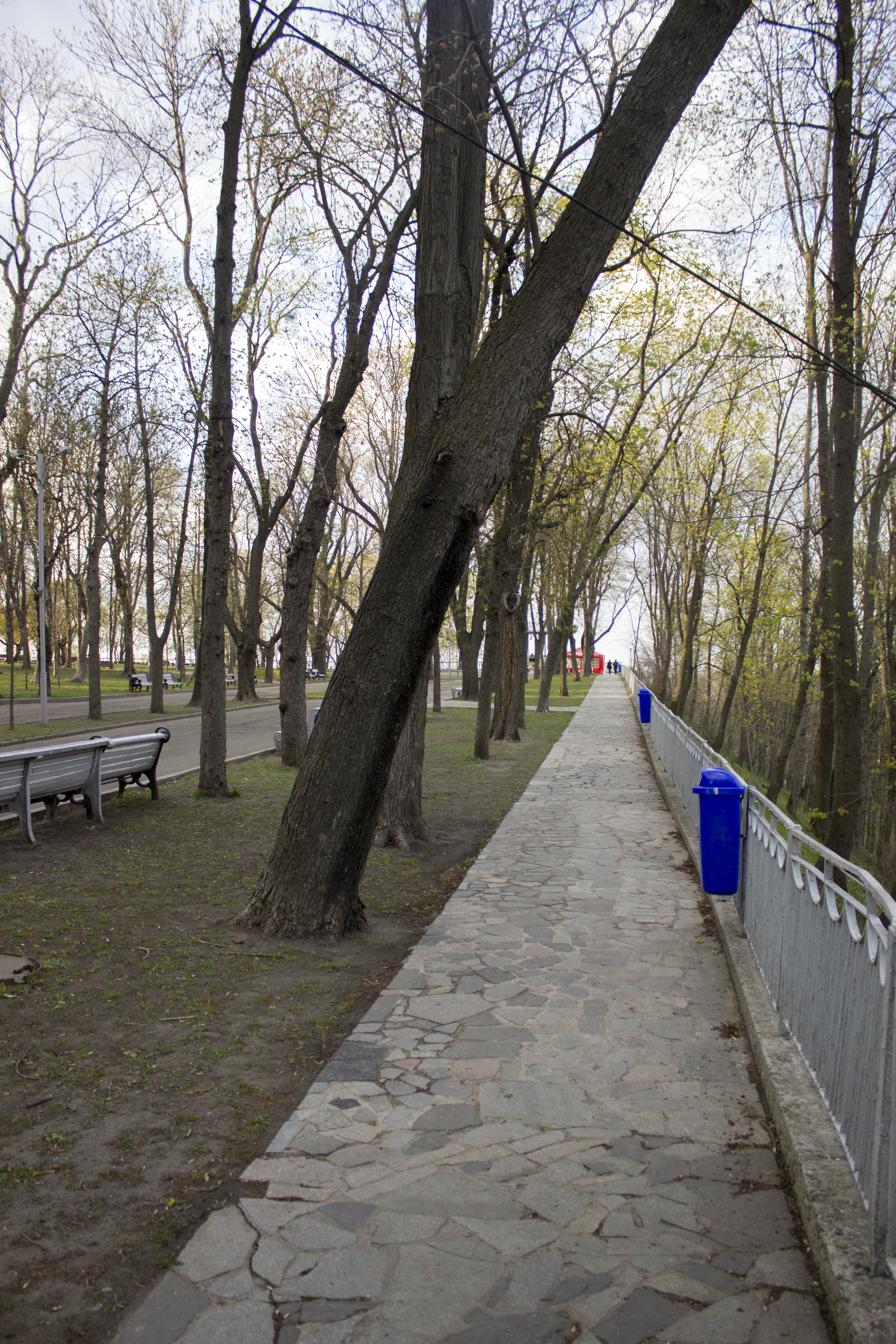

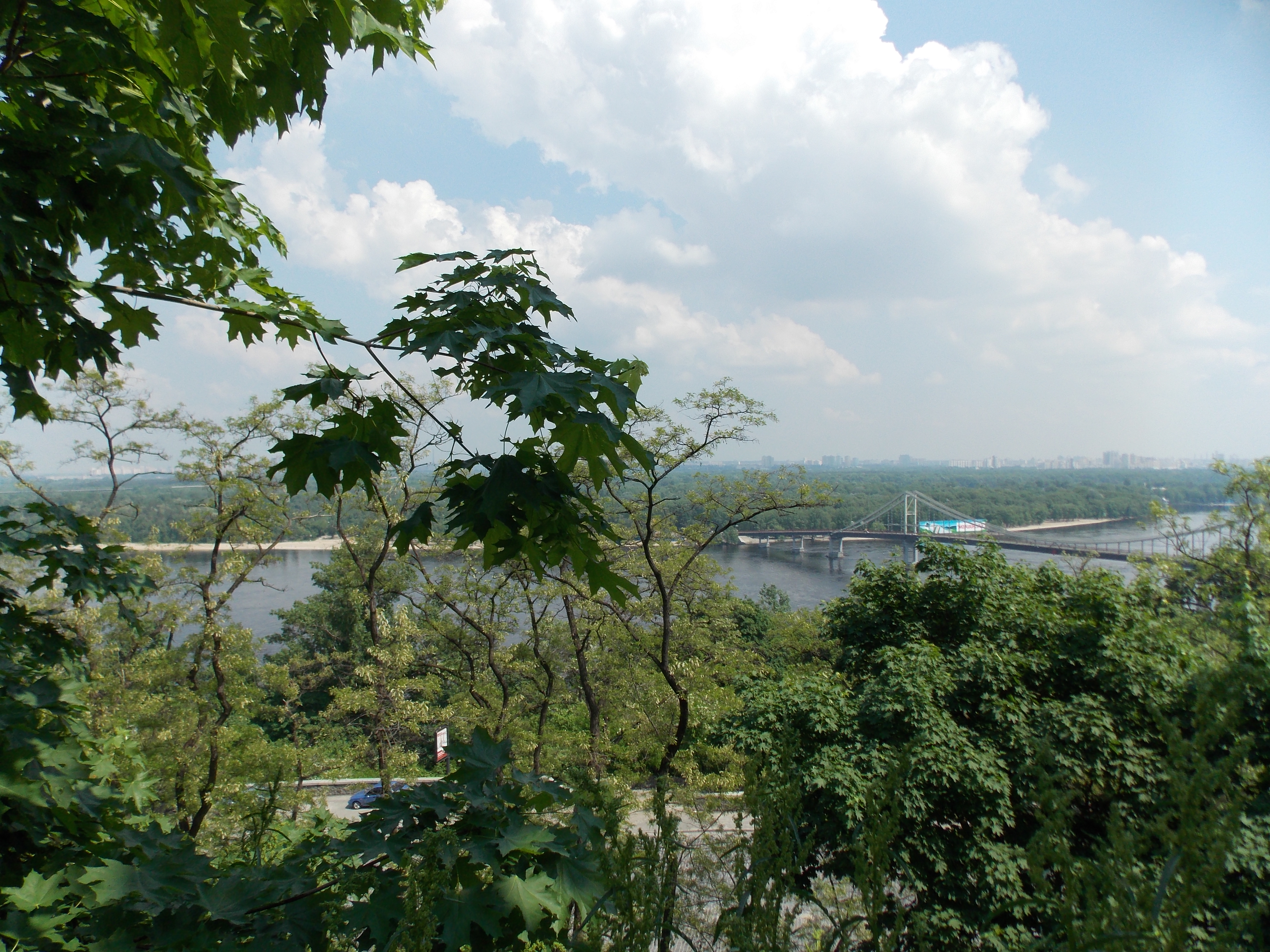

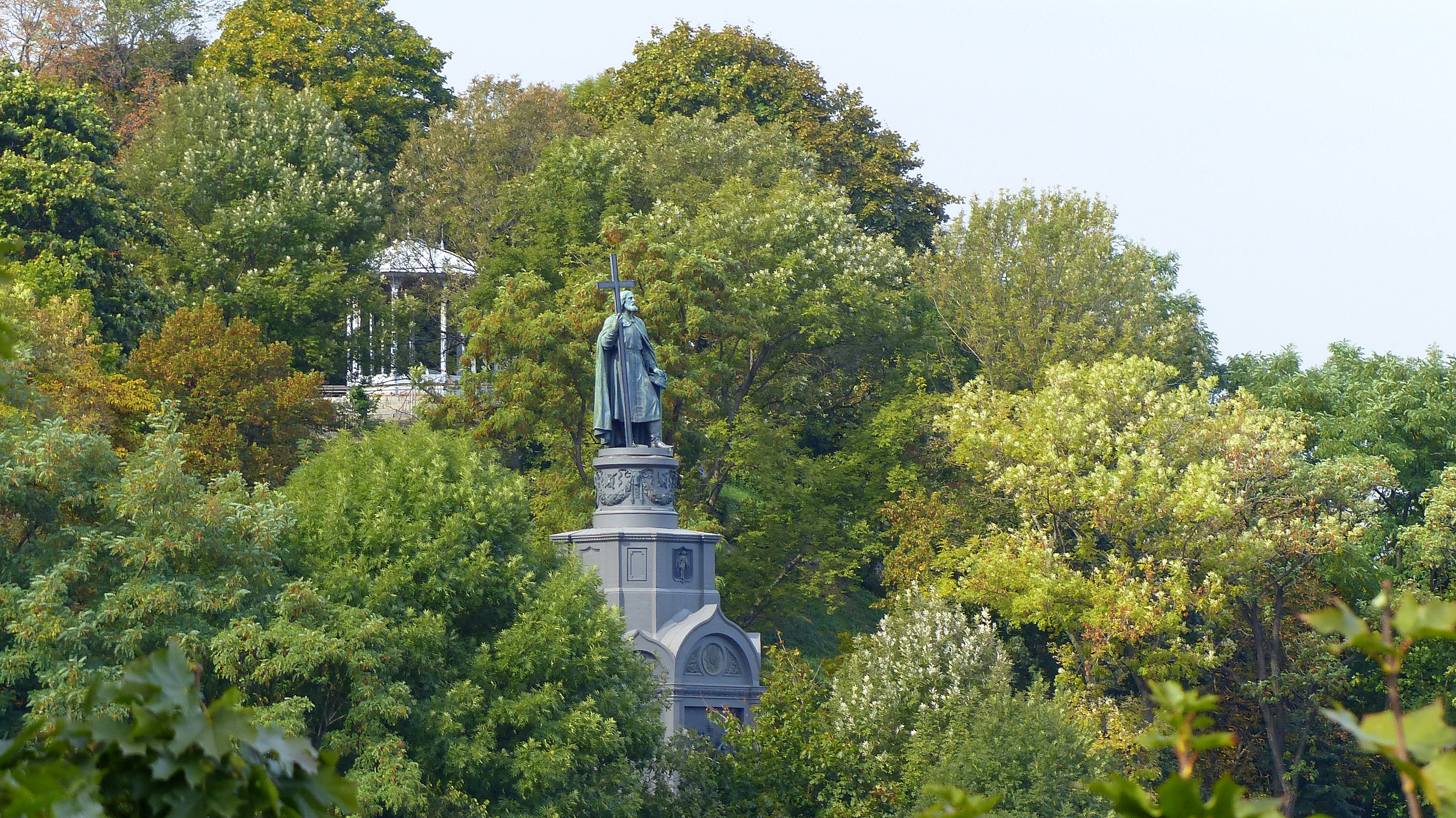

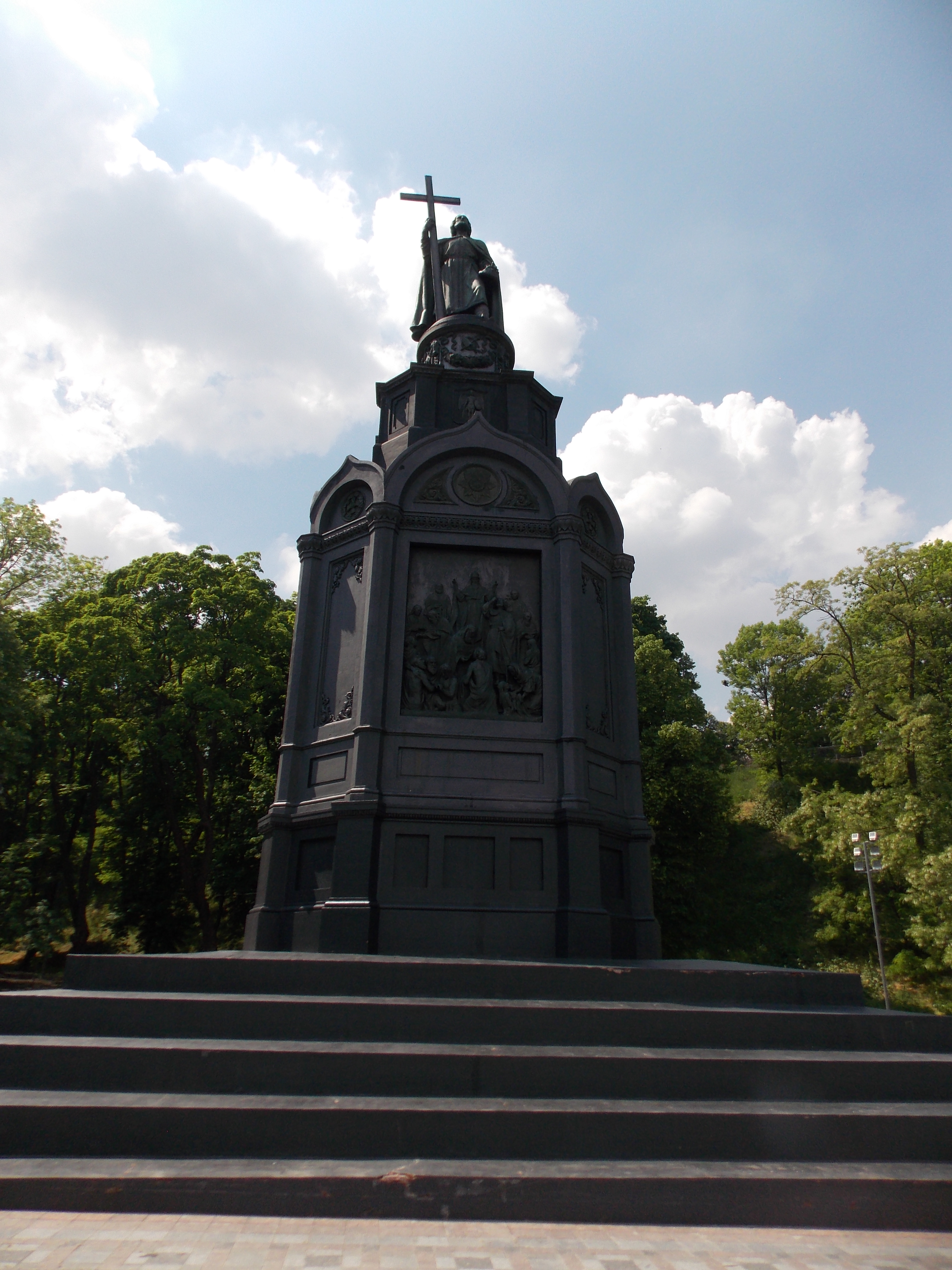

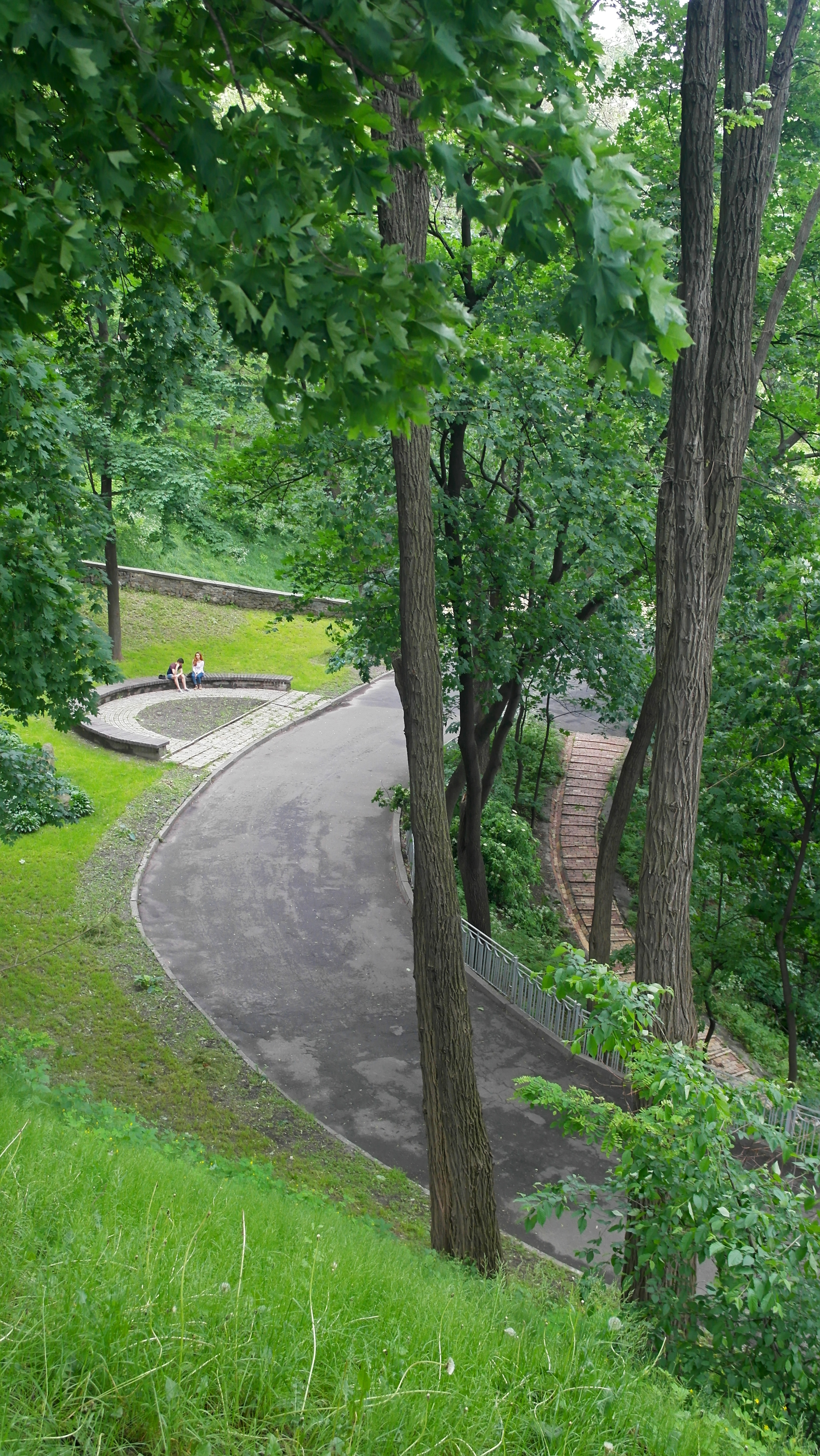

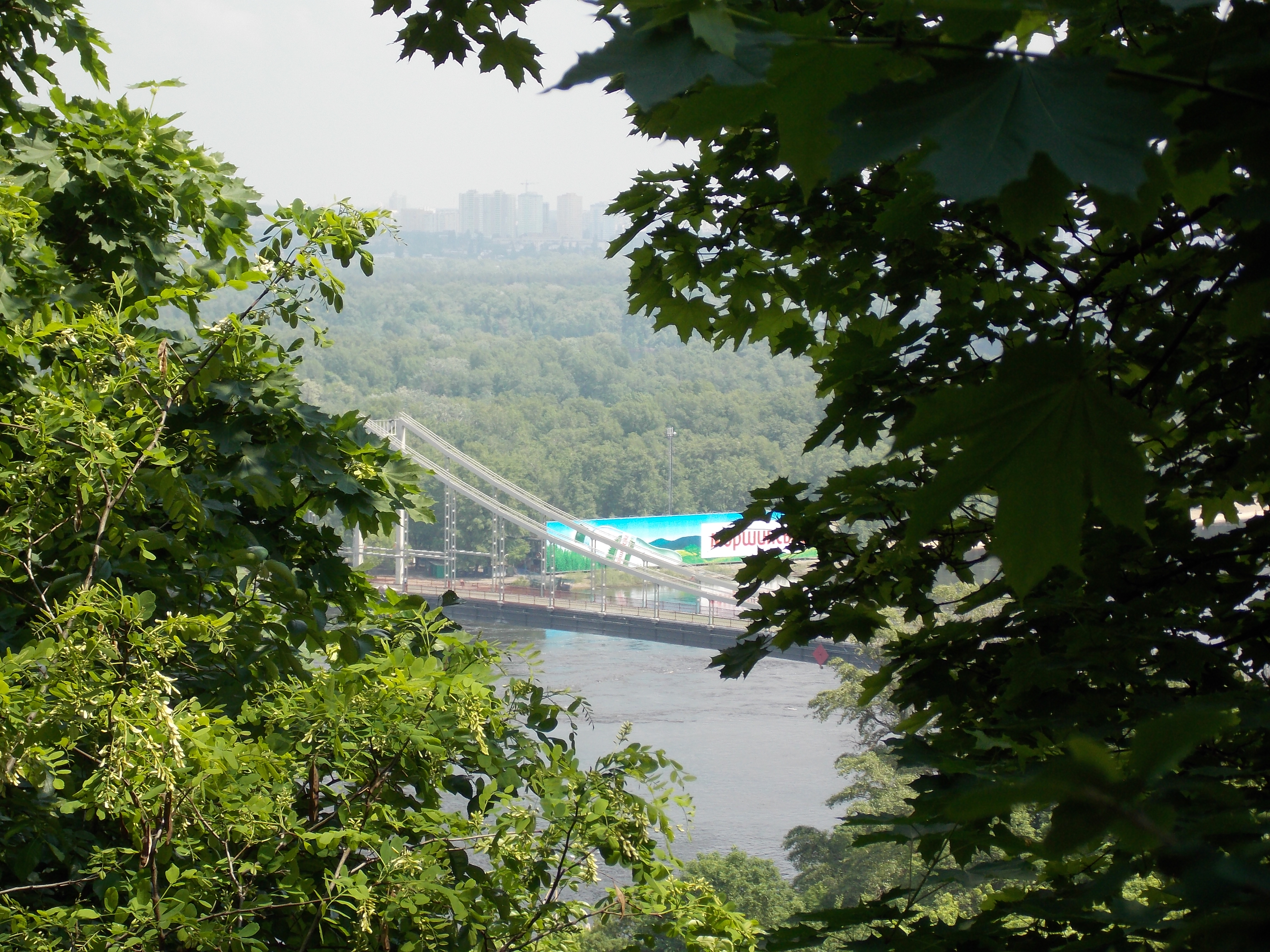

== See also ==
- Andriyivskyy Descent
- Monument to Prince Volodymyr
- Saint Volodymyr Descent
