= National Philharmonic of Ukraine =

Concert halls in Kyiv, Ukraine

Coordinates: 50°27′12″N 30°31′42″E

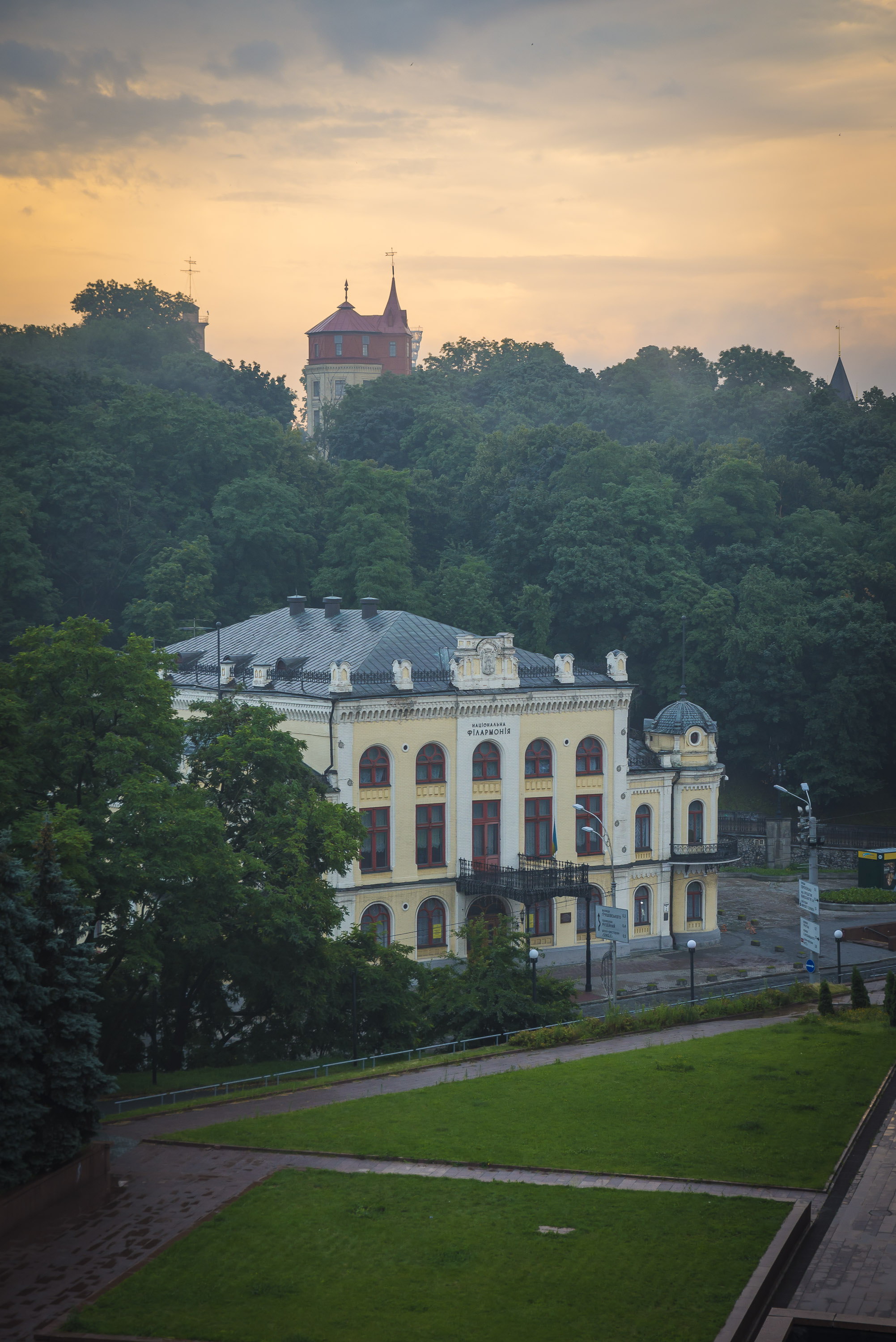
Lysenko Column Hall

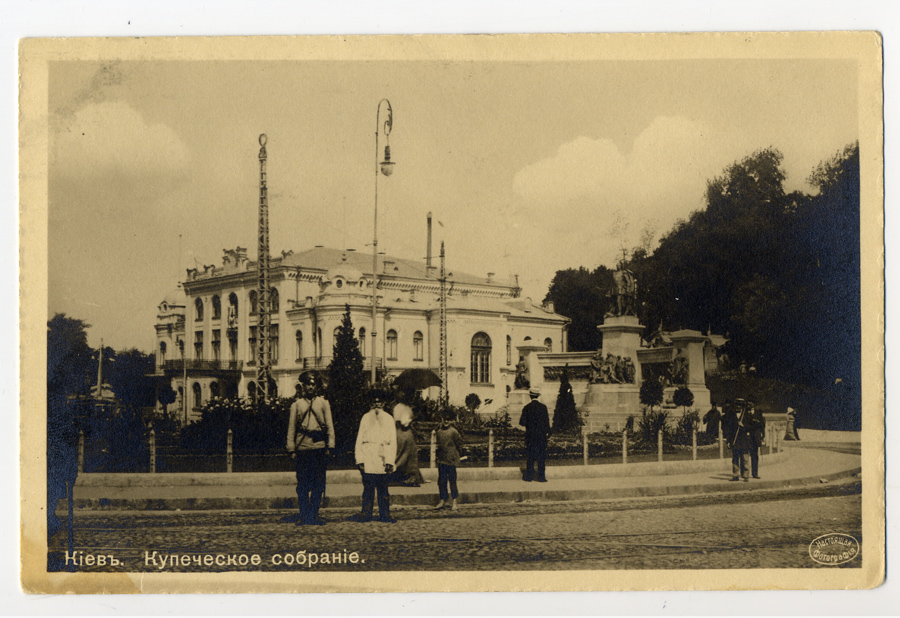
Early 20th century Russian postcard depicting the Merchants Assembly building in Kyiv.

The National Philharmonic of Ukraine (Ukrainian: Національна Філармонія України, romanized: Natsionalna Filarmoniia Ukrainy), often referred to as the Kyiv Philharmonic and National Philharmonic, is a complex of two adjacent concert halls in the Khreshchatyi Park in Kyiv, Ukraine. Formerly the Merchant's House, the building's use for musical performances is associated with the Philharmonic Society, established by Mykola Lysenko.

The historic building was built at the end of the 19th century. Standing at the end of Khreshchatyk street near the European Square, it has hosted numerous Russian composers such as Sergei Rachmaninoff, Alexander Scriabin, and Pyotr Ilyich Tchaikovsky and famous opera singers like Leonid Sobinov and Feodor Chaliapin.

== History ==
=== The Merchant's House ===
At the end of the nineteenth century, Kyiv, at the time the leading commercial center in the south-west of the Russian Empire, flourished in its cultural development. In 1881, the Council of Elders of the Kyiv Merchants Assembly acquired permission to establish a recreational area in the Tsarskaya (Tsar’s) Square (now the European Square) where a year later a brick building decorated with towers and metal eaves was erected by the famous Kyiv architect Vladimir Nikolayev and named the Merchants' House (Merchants' Assembly). The building rapidly gained recognition among Kyiv residents and became the center for cultural gatherings where society held masquerade balls, science and political conferences, charitable lotteries, and literary evenings. Because of the building's good acoustics the Merchants' House became popular for musical performances.

The history of the Merchants' House has been greatly affected by the Ukrainian composer, pianist and conductor Mykola Lysenko. As one of the founders of the Philharmonic Society, Ukrainian Club, and Ukrainian School of Music, Lysenko was elected to the directorate board of the Merchants' House and brought the music of many Russian and European composers to the citizens of Kyiv.

After the Russian Revolution the building underwent a big change in its purpose and accommodated the Proletarian House of Arts, converted to the House of Political Education, and later to the Bolshevik Club and Republican Palace of Pioneers. The Merchant's Assembly ceased to exist in 1919. In 1927, the Philharmonic Society moved to Kharkiv when the city became the capital of the Ukrainian Soviet Socialist Republic. But in 1934 it returned to Kyiv when the city regained its status.

After the 1941 Nazi invasion, the Philharmonic Society stopped its work, and most of its priceless archives were destroyed. During the German occupation of Kyiv, the Society's building was converted to a German Officer's Club. This was one of the important reasons why the building was not destroyed, remaining one of the very few surviving pre-war buildings on Khreshchatyk street. Following the liberation of Kyiv, the Philharmonic Society building resumed its operation in 1944 as soon as hostilities moved away from Kyiv.

=== National Philharmonic ===
In 1962, the building was renamed to Mykola Lysenko Kyiv State Philharmonic in honor of the composer's 120th birthday anniversary and the 50th anniversary of his death. It was also awarded the status of architectural monument. In the 1980s, the building suffered a flood, during which many of its music libraries and archives perished. The conditions demanded restoration, which began in 1995. A year later, the restored building opened its doors to the public.

In October 1994, the newly elected President of Ukraine, Leonid Kuchma, granted the building the status of National Philharmonic of Ukraine. In 2000, the National Philharmonic received a cultural grant from the Government of Japan with which it was able to acquire a new concert grand piano and additional musical instruments for its symphony orchestra, the Symphony Orchestra of the National Philharmonic of Ukraine.

Today, the Lysenko Colonnaded Hall of the Philharmonic remains one of the two most prestigious classical music stages in the city (along with the Kyiv Opera). Director of the Philharmonic since 1996 is Volodymyr Lukashev.

== Academic Symphony Orchestra of the National Philharmonic of Ukraine ==
The Symphony Orchestra of the National Philharmonic of Ukraine was founded in September, 1995, under the leadership of Leonid Tykhonov. A year later in 1996 the young Mykola Dyadura took over. Since the concert season of 2012–2013 Roman Kofman was the orchestra's chief conductor until his death in 2026. Today the orchestra is acknowledged as one of the best ensembles in Eastern Europe.

The orchestra has collaborated with distinguished artists from the past and present, including vocalists Luciano Pavarotti and Montserrat Caballé, violinists Gidon Kremer, Salvatore Accardo and Liana Isakadze, cellists Natalya Gutman, Gautier Capuçon and pianists including Paul Badura Skoda, Dmitry Bashkirov, Elisso Virsaladze and Pierre-Laurent Aimard, among others. It has also commissioned and premiered works by renowned contemporary composers, including Giya Kancheli, Krzysztof Penderecki, Myroslav Skoryk, Yevhen Stankovych, and Mikis Theodorakis while popularizing compositions of the most important Ukrainian composers of the recent past and present, including Lyatoshynsky, Sylvestrov, Stankovych, Skoryk.

The National Philharmonic Orchestra of Ukraine has appeared at prestigious festivals including Le Mélomane (France), Saint-Maxime Music Fest (France), La Chaise-Dieu (France), La Côte Saint André H. Berlioz Festival (France), Marseille International Sacred Music Festival (France), Bleckede Fest (Germany), Wroclaw Fest (Poland), and Ukrainian Culture Days in Switzerland (Bern). International tours have taken the orchestra to Austria, Germany, France, Poland, Spain, Switzerland, Turkey, Japan, and China, earning widespread critical acclaim.

== See also ==
- All-Ukrainian National Congress
