= Khreshchatyi Park =

Park-monument of landscape art in Kyiv, Ukraine

Coordinates: 50.4531°N 30.5314°E

- Хрещатий парк
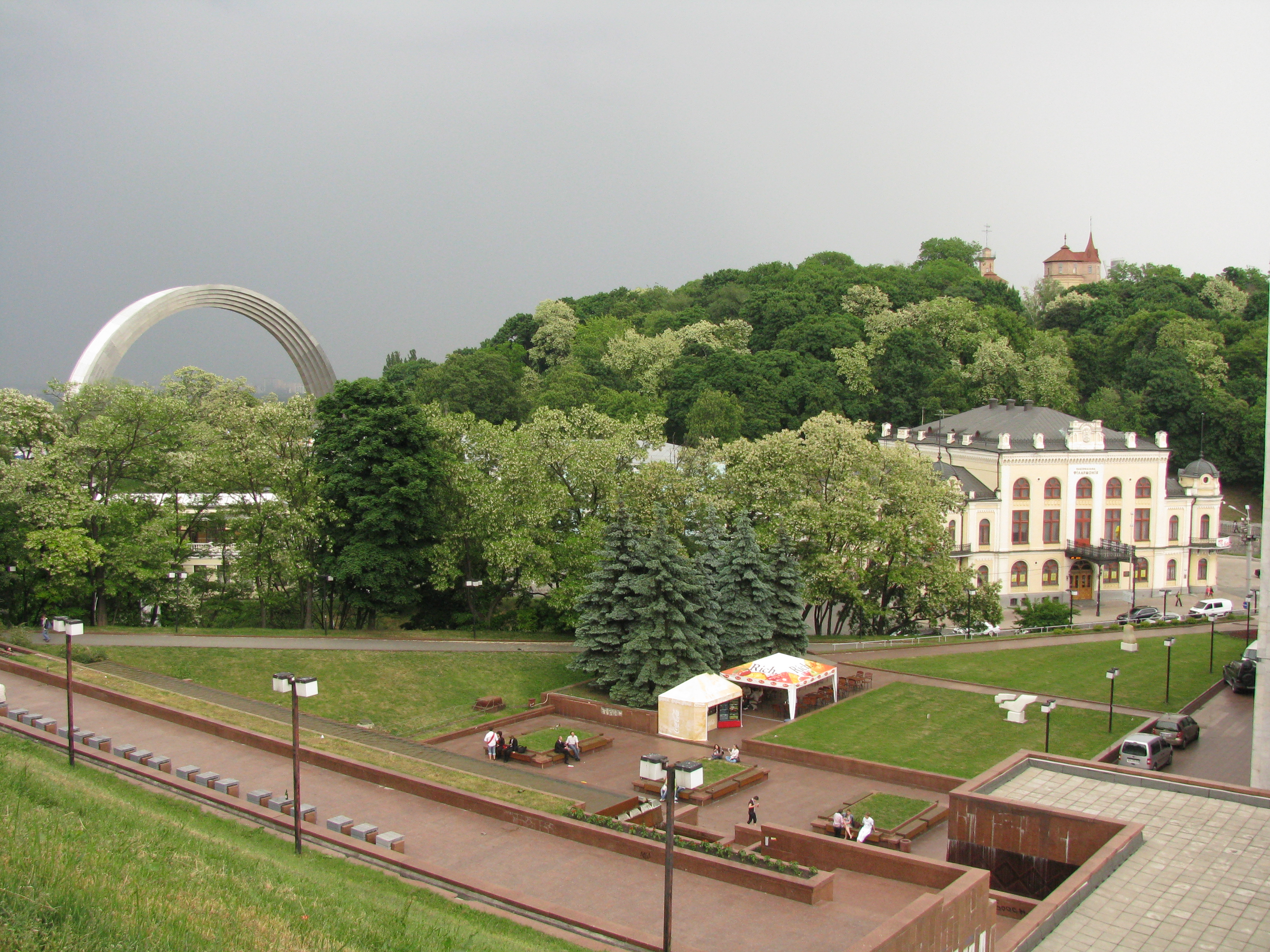
- View onto the park from Volodymyrska Hill
- Interactive map of Khreshchatyi Park
- Type: public park
- Location: Shevchenko Raion, Kyiv, Ukraine
- Area: 11.8 hectares (29 acres)
- Created: 1743

Khreshchatyi Park (Ukrainian: Хрещатий парк) is a city park in Kyiv, located next to the European Square, on right-bank slopes of the Dnipro and along the Saint Volodymyr Descent. It covers area of 11.8 ha (29 acres).

Since 2019, a glass pedestrian bridge has connected the park with Volodymyr Hill.

== Visitor's attractions and landmarks ==
- National Philharmonic of Ukraine
- National Parliamentary Library of Ukraine
- Arch of Freedom of the Ukrainian People
- Monument to the Magdeburg Rights
- Monument to Mikhail Glinka
- Kyiv Water Museum (Water information center)
- Kyiv State Puppets Theater (previously the Dnipro Stereo-Cinema Theater)

=== Former landmarks ===
- Monument to Alexander II of Russia (replaced with Joseph Stalin)
- Monument to Grigory Petrovsky

== Gallery ==
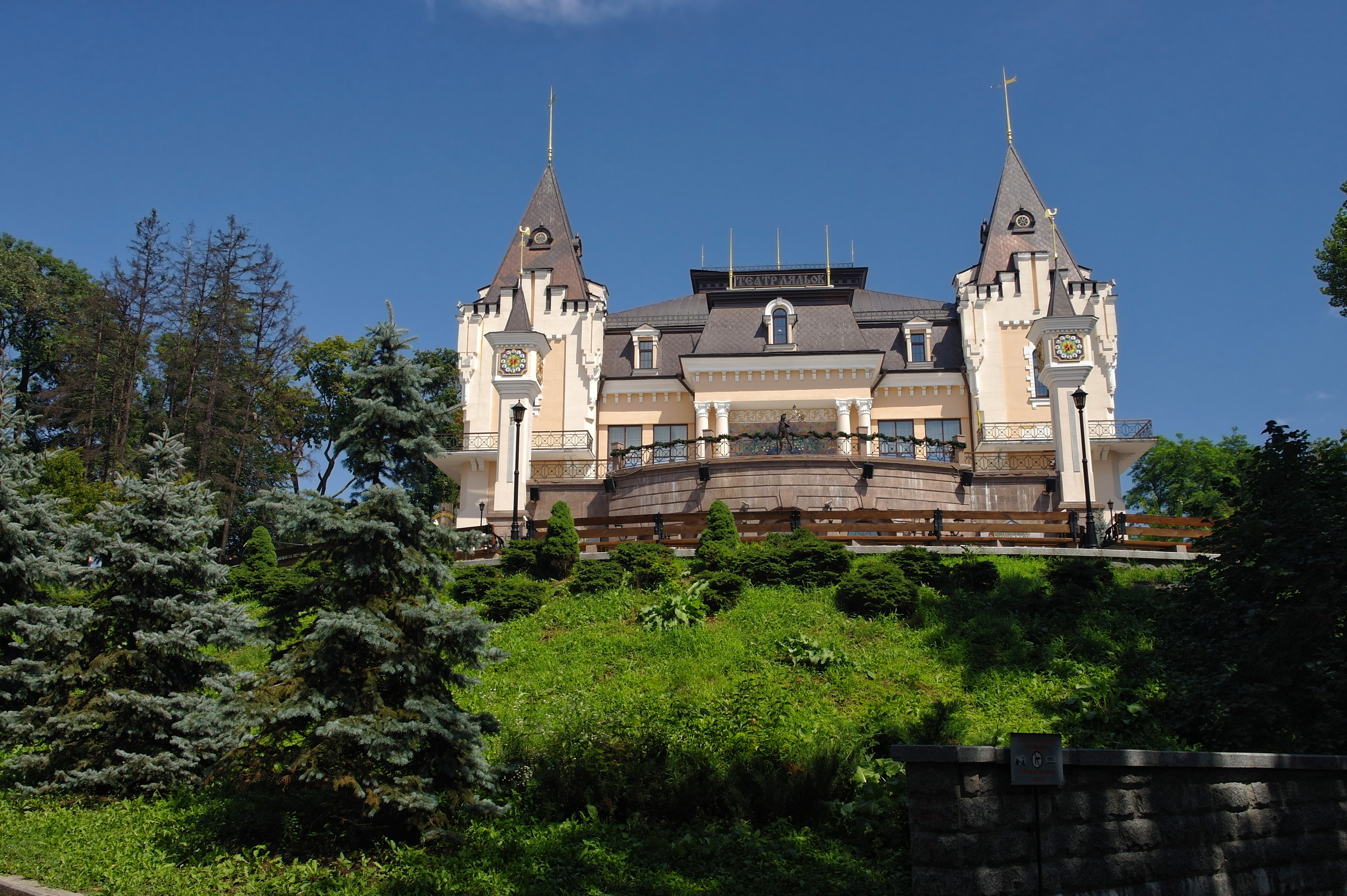
Puppets Theater

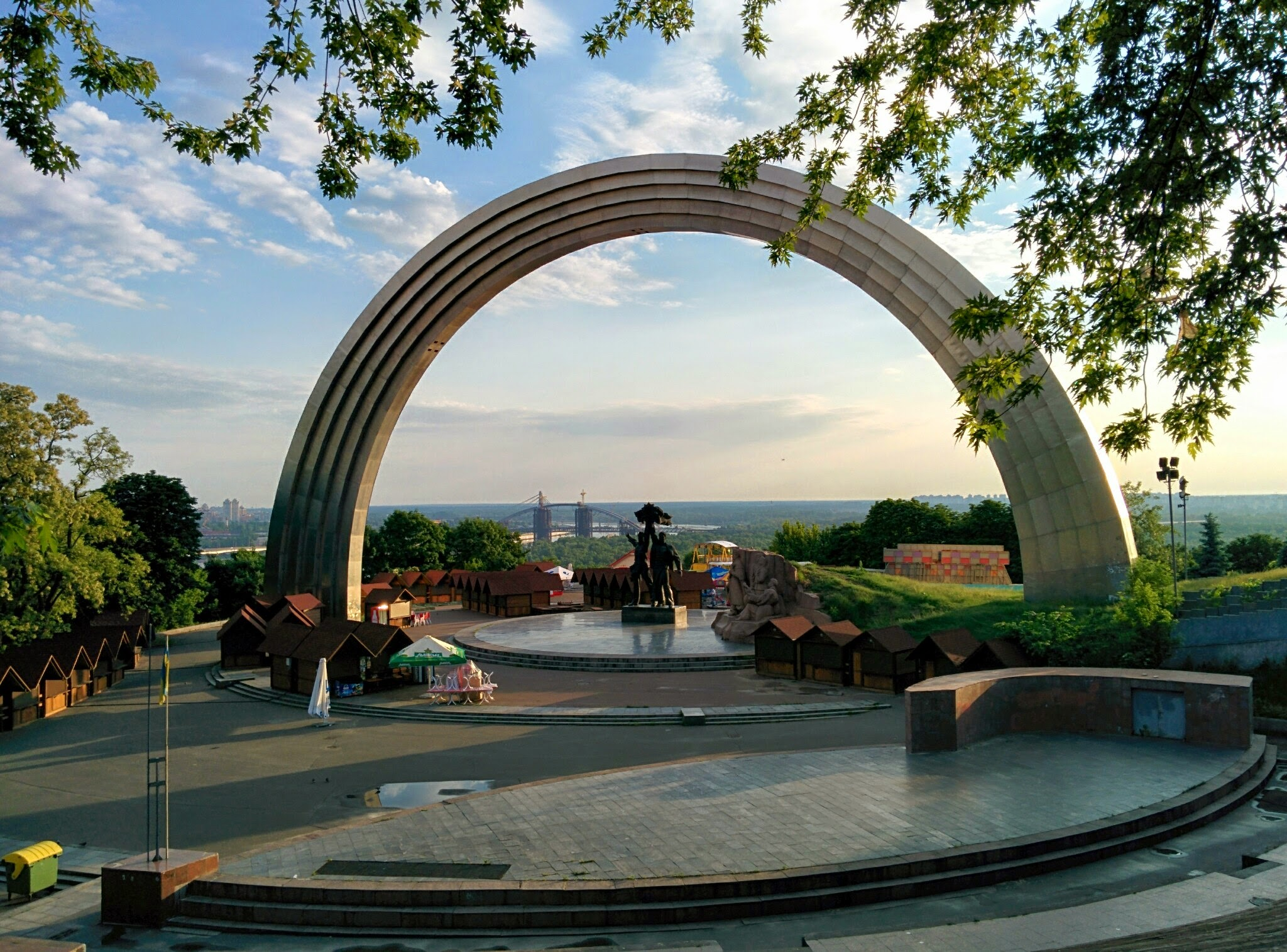
Arch of Freedom of the Ukrainian People

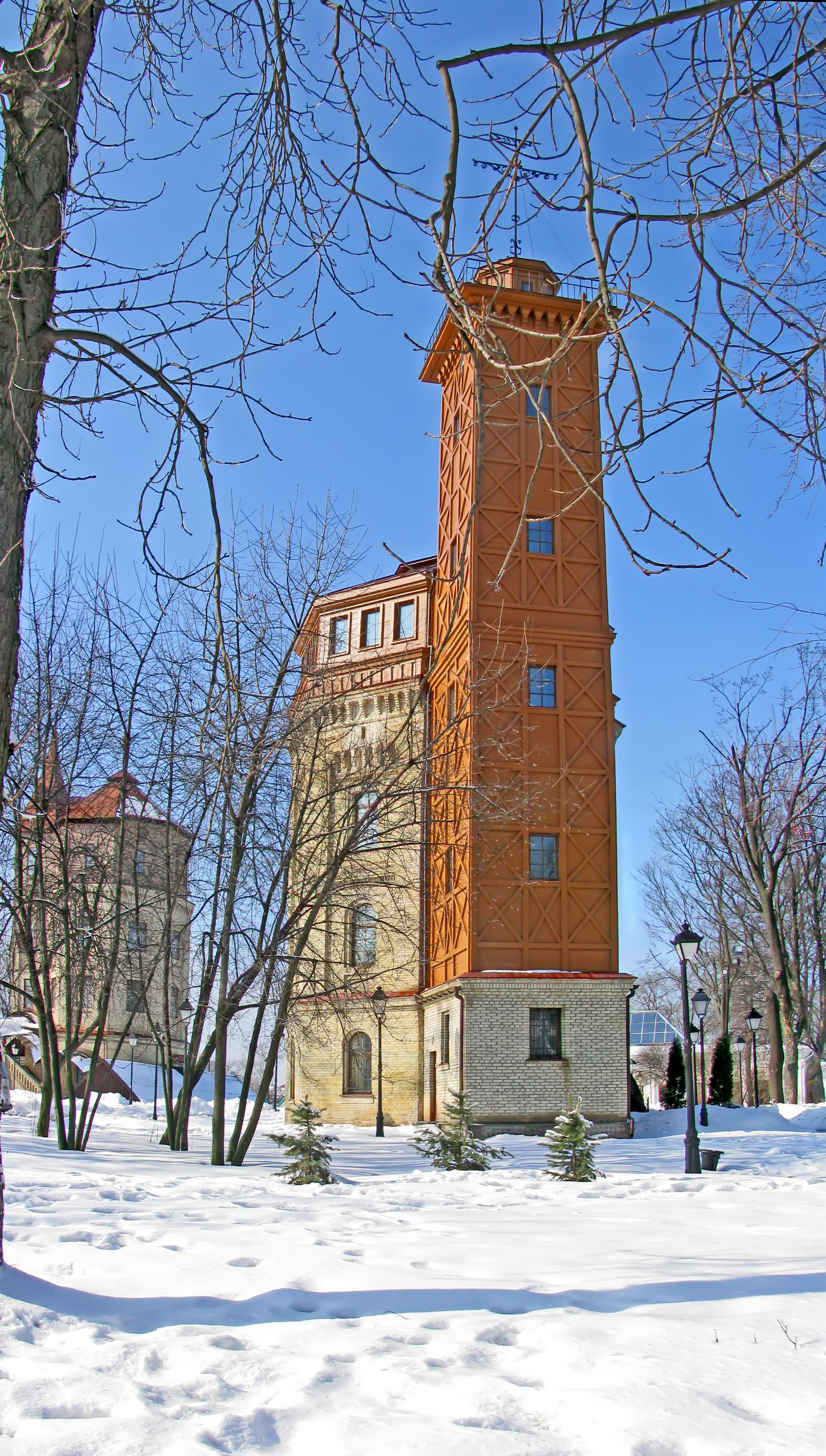
Water tower (Museum of Water)

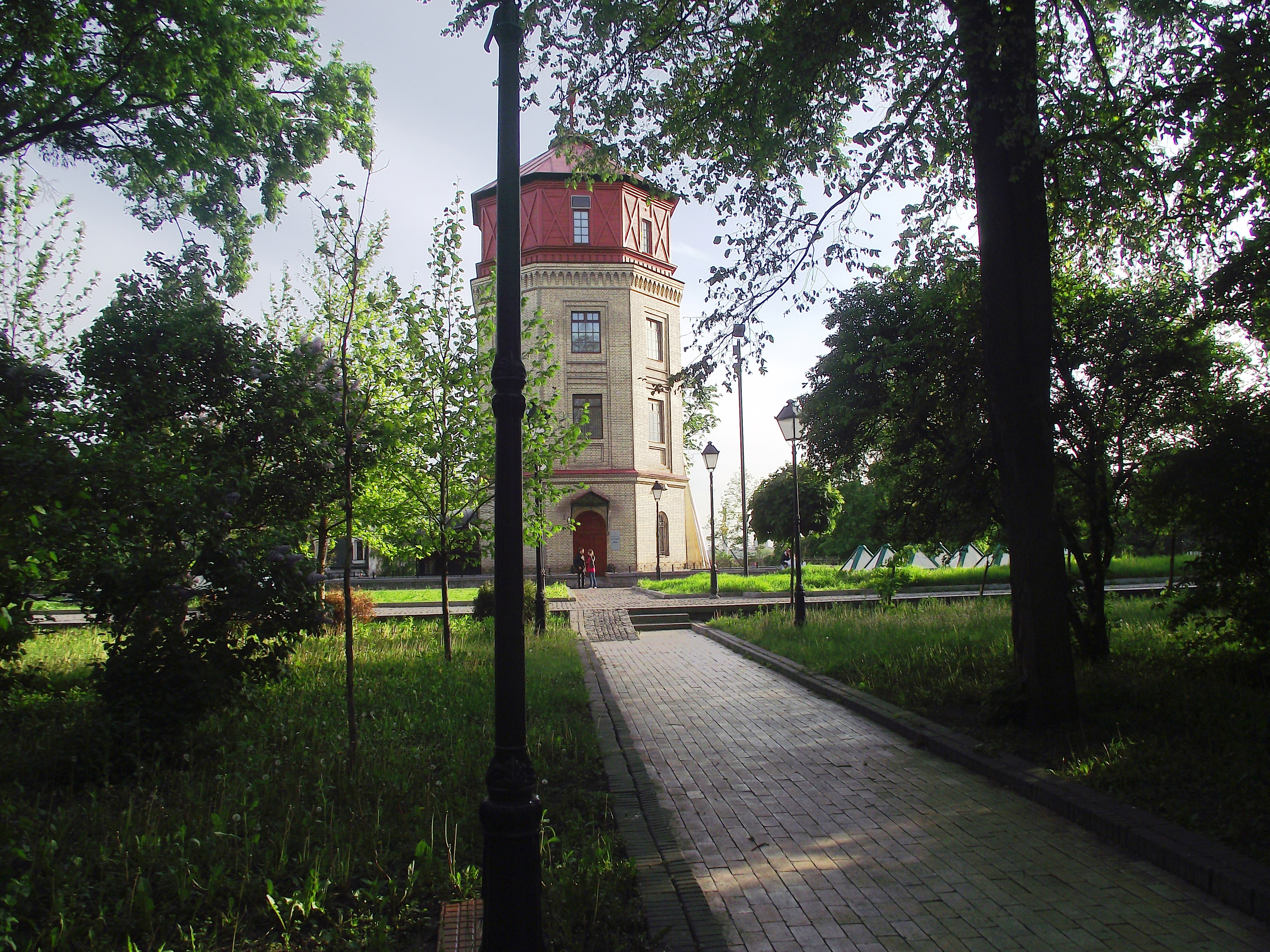
Water tower (Museum of Water)

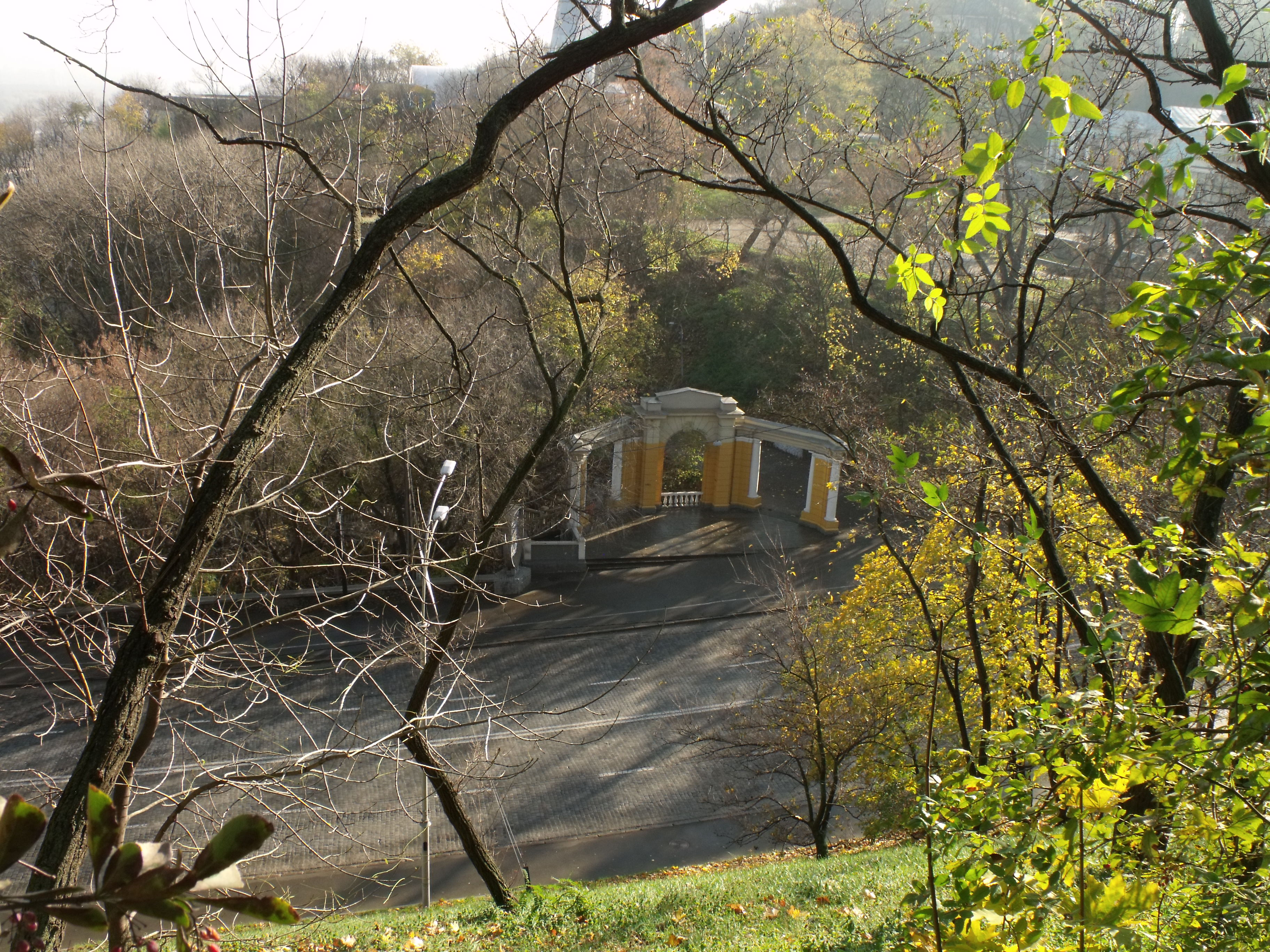
Arch to the Magdeburg Right's Monument

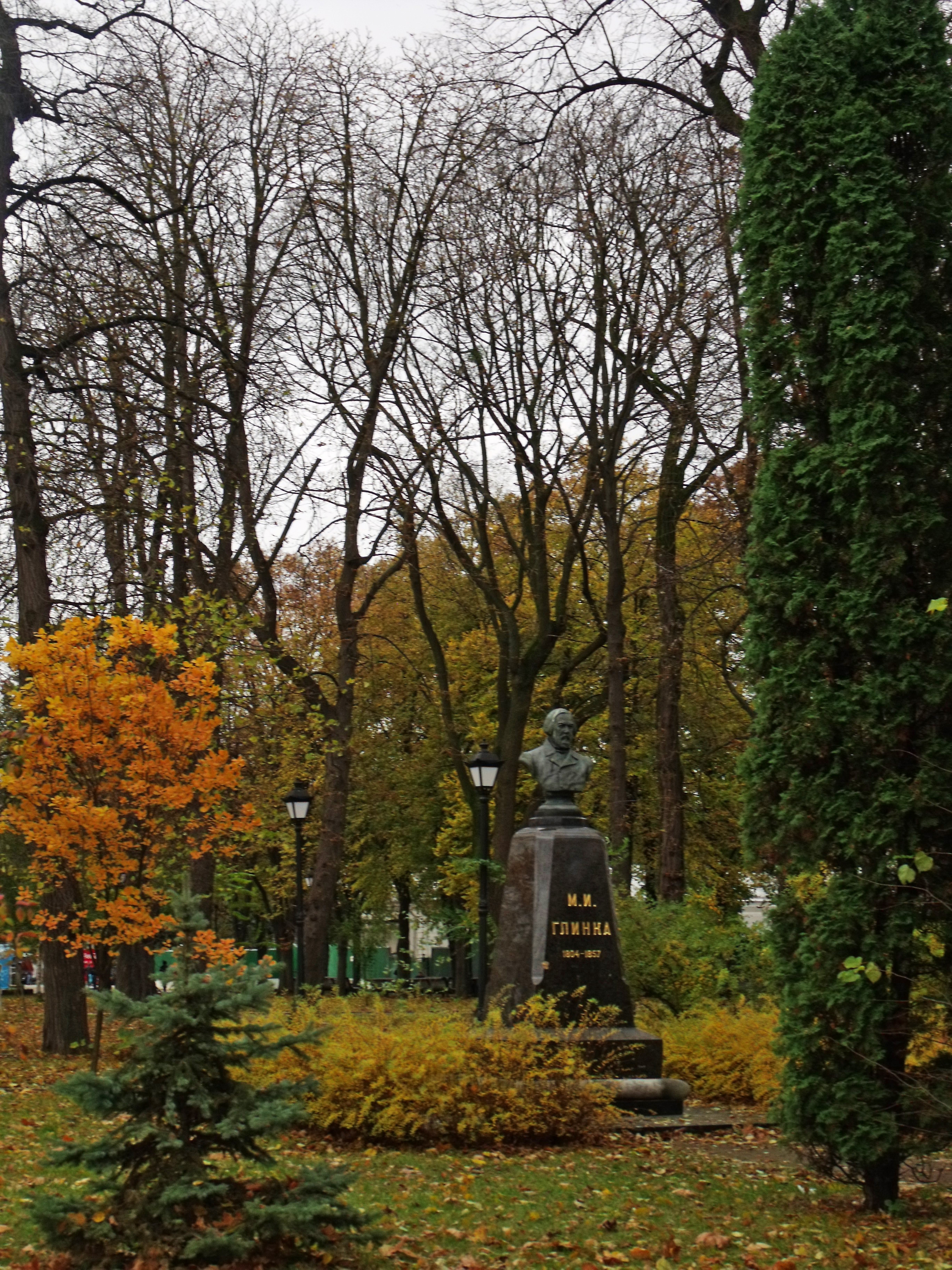
Glinka Monument
