= Saint Volodymyr Descent =

Street in Kyiv, Ukraine

Coordinates: 50.4529°N 30.5279°E

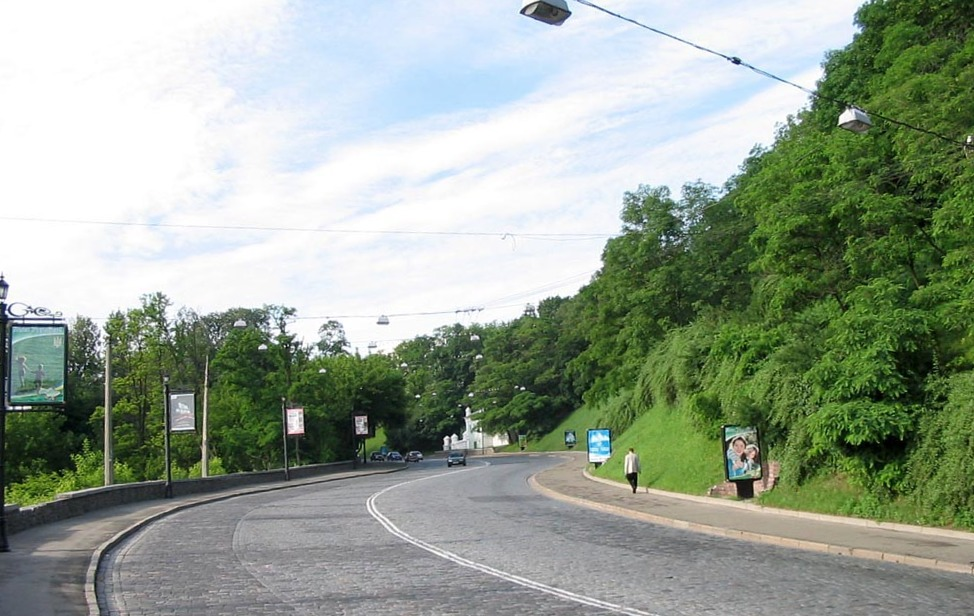
- A view of the Volodymyrskyi Descent from the Volodymyrskyi Park in Kyiv (2005).
- Native name: Володимирський узвіз (Ukrainian)
- Length: 0.830 km (0.516 mi)
- Location: Pecherskyi District; Kyiv, Ukraine

Saint Volodymyr Descent (Ukrainian: Володимирський узвіз, romanized: Volodymyrskyi uzviz) is a street in Kyiv located between the Pechersk and Podil city districts. It stretches from European Square to Postal Square.

The city street splits two city parks (Khreshchatyi Park and Saint Volodymyr Hill) located on the slopes of Saint Michael Hill (see Kyiv Mountains). The two parks are connected by the Bridge over Saint Volodymyr Descent, also called the Klitschko Bridge or the Kyiv Glass Bridge, which opened on 25 May 2019.

The street started to form in 1711 in place of the so-called Old Pechersk Road that used to connect Pechersk with Podil. As a city street it was known originally as Khreshchatyi Drive (Ukrainian: Хрещатицький приїзд, Khreshchatytskyi pryizd) and later as Paved Street (Ukrainian: Мостова вулиця, Mostova vulytsia) becoming the first city's street paved with cobblestone. Sometime in 1810s it became part of a long Aleksandr Street (after Alexander II of Russia) that stretched all the way from Arsenal Square to Contracts Square, while the descent was unofficially referred to as Aleksandr Descent. After the occupation of Kyiv by the Soviet troops in March 1919 the long street was renamed as Revolution Street (October Revolution). When Kyiv became the capital of the Soviet Ukraine in 1934, the street was renamed once again, now as Sergei Kirov Street after the soviet government official Sergei Kirov. During the Nazi occupation the street along with the modern Hrushevskyi Street carried the name of the Nazi political figure Fritz Todt.

During the World War II when Kyiv was freed from Nazi occupation, the former long Kirov Street was split at the Stalin Square (today European Square) into Kirov Street (today Hrushevskyi Street) and Volodymyr Descent that stretched from the Stalin Square to Contracts Square. In 1955 the street was shortened and part of it between Postal Square and Contracts Square was renamed Zhdanov Street (today Sahaidachny Street) after the Soviet official Andrei Zhdanov.
