= Bridge over Saint Volodymyr Descent =

Bridge in Kyiv, Ukraine

Pedestrian and cycling bridge over Saint Volodymyr Descent Пішохідно-велосипедний міст через Володимирський узвіз
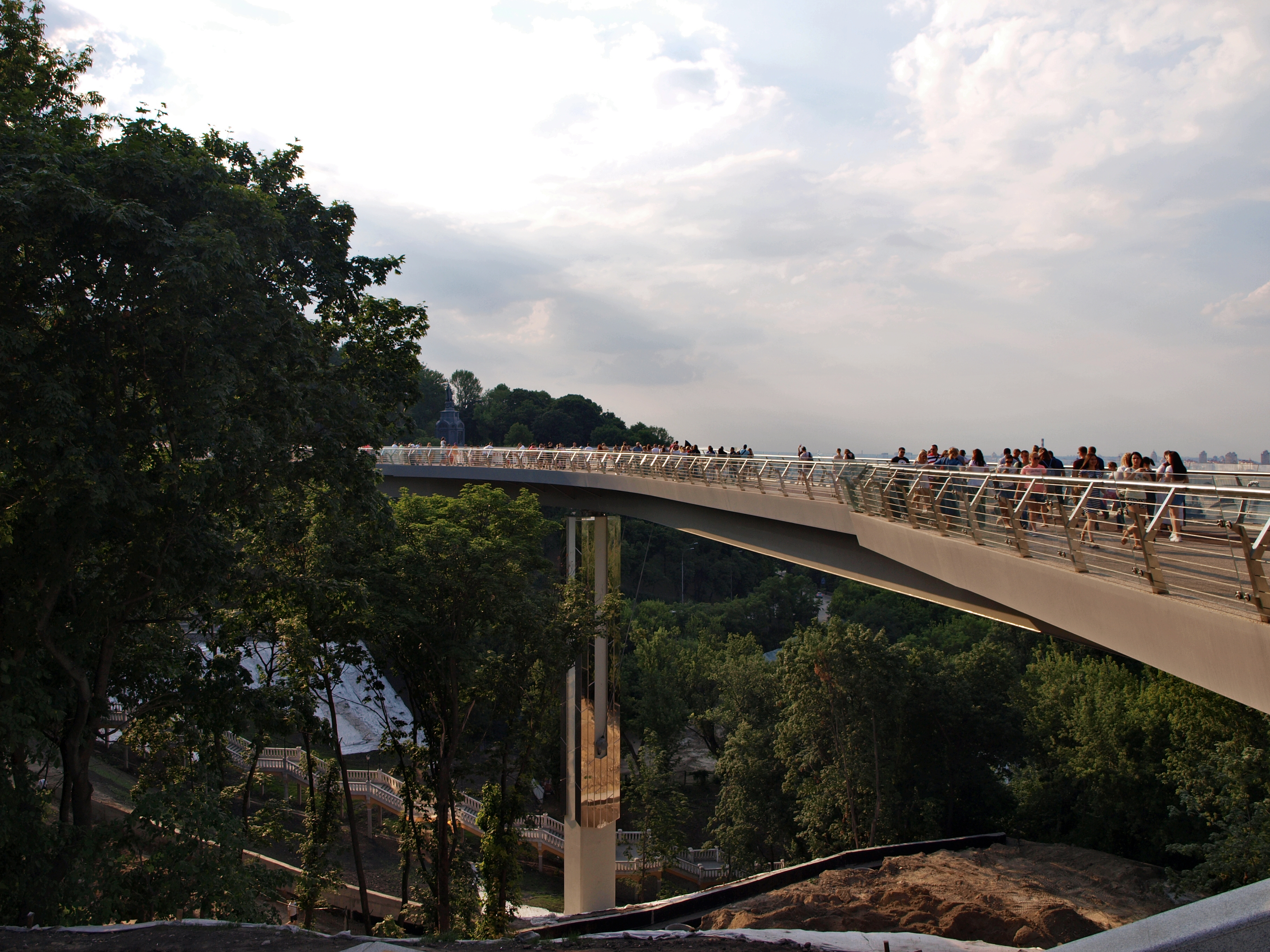
- Coordinates: 50°27′19″N 30°31′42″E
- Carries: pedestrians, cyclists
- Crosses: Saint Volodymyr Descent
- Locale: Kyiv, Ukraine
- Official name: Pedestrian and bicycle bridge over Saint Volodymyr Descent
- Other name: Klitschko Glass Bridge

Characteristics
- Material: Glass, steel

History
- Architect: Andriy Myrhorodskyi; Project Systems LTD
- Constructed by: SpetsAvtoBud
- Fabrication by: Azovstal; Okean
- Construction start: December 2018
- Construction end: May 2019
- Construction cost: $10 000 000
- Opened: May 25, 2019; 7 years ago

Location
- Interactive map of Pedestrian and cycling bridge over Saint Volodymyr Descent

Pedestrian and cycling bridge over Saint Volodymyr Descent or Volodymyrskyi Descent (Ukrainian: Пішохідно-велосипедний міст через Володимирський узвіз, romanized: Pishokhidno-velosypednyi mist cherez Volodomyrskyi uzviz), also known as Klitschko Glass Bridge (Скляний міст Кличка, Sklianyi mist Klychka), is a bridge connecting two parks in Kyiv, Ukraine—the Saint Volodymyr Hill and Khreshchatyi Park—over the street Saint Volodymyr Descent. It is used by pedal cycles and pedestrians only. Built over five months at a cost of 275 million hryvnia, the bridge was opened by Kyiv mayor Vitali Klitschko on 25 May 2019.

== History ==
=== Background ===
Crowds on the bridge in summer 2019

The original idea of the bridge between two parks belongs to a Ukrainian architect Vasyl Krychevsky. The bridge was supposed to be a part of Kyiv Government Center project made for architecture contest that was held in 1934, when Kyiv regained its status as the Ukrainian capital. Krychevsky designed the traffic viaduct that was planned to connect the Central Committee of the Communist Party and the Council of People's Commissars. He was praised for the viaduct project, but his variant of Government Center was dismissed.

In the independent Ukraine, the plan of building the bridge was brought back up in 2006. At the meeting of Kyiv Architecture Department on 6 September Heorhiy Dukhovnychyi presented the project of a shopping mall with offices and apartments at Saint Volodymyr Descent. The building featured a bridge over the descent, making it similar to Kyiv's central shopping mall Globus that was built in 2002 and had a similar bridge connecting its roof with a park. The project was approved for further development, but it had never ended up anything more than a concept.

In 2013, Kyiv City State Administration decided to build a bridge between two parks and open it in 2014. The contest where Kyiv citizens had to choose the best project took place in May. The contest was international and featured participants from different countries: ipv Delft from Netherlands, Buro Happold from United Kingdom, Asadov Architectural Studio from Russia, Leuppi & Schafroth Architekten from Switzerland, RR Architectes from Spain and two projects from Ukraine, one from Soyuzdorproekt and one from Kyivdormistproekt. However, the contest failed because of the split of opinion – the citizens chose a project from the Netherlands while the contest judges couldn't decide between Spain and Switzerland.

=== Final project ===
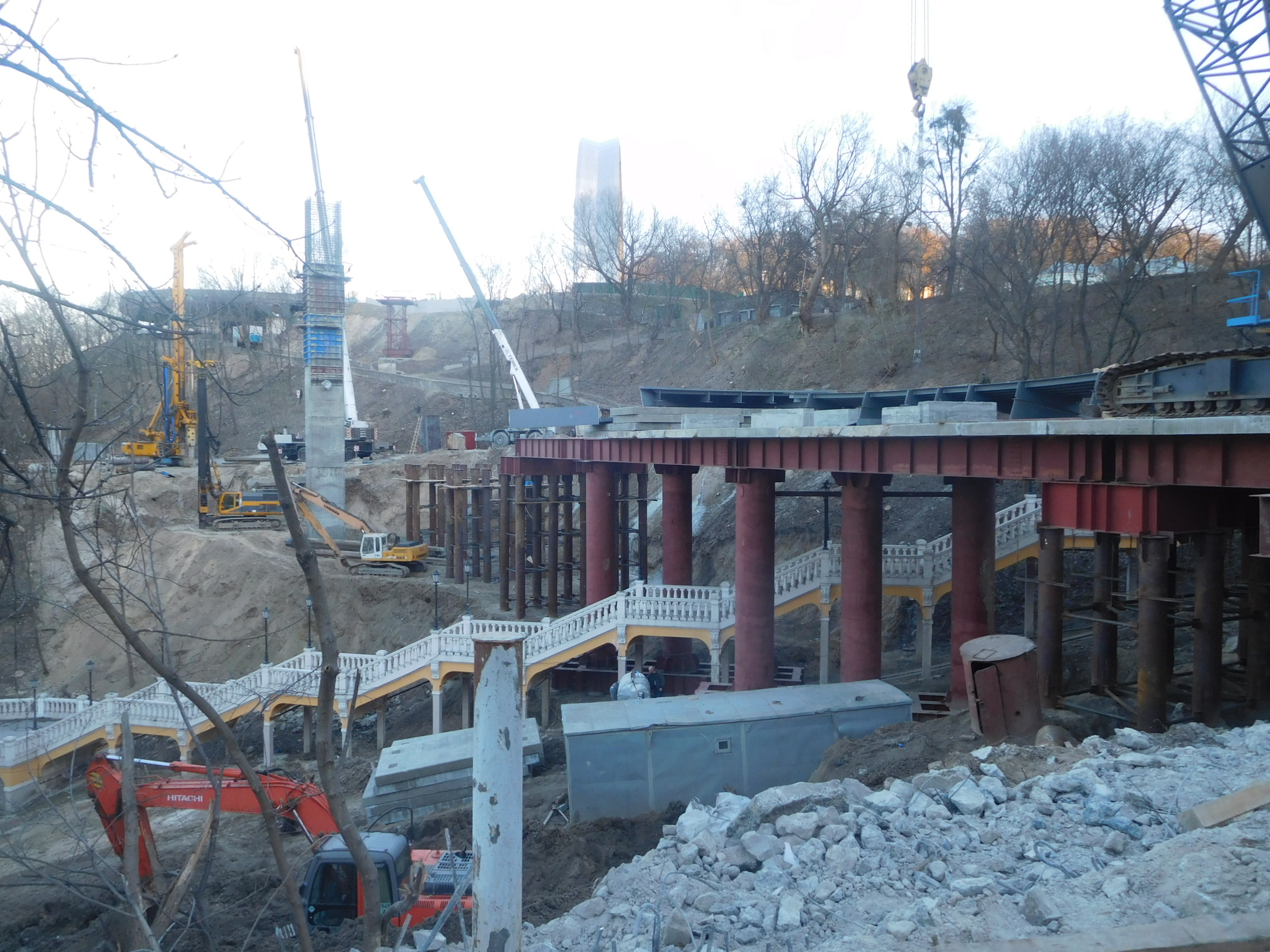
Construction process (1 April 2019)

The order to build a new pedestrian and bicycle bridge was issued by Kyiv City State Administration in February 2017, the project's architect had to be decided in a contest. In October 2018, Project Systems LTD was chosen as a winner with a project of Andriy Myrhorodskyi, it featured a 210 meters long steel bridge with glass elements. In November, SpetsAvtoBud had won the tender to build the footbridge, structural steel with ultimate tensile strength of 420 MPa for the construction was fabricated in Azovstal and Okean.

The land preparation began in December 2018. The construction of piers was started in February 2019, the descent was temporarily narrowed with fence to place the cranes. The installation of spans began in March, the final one was installed in April, Klitschko posted a video in Facebook where, following the tradition, the champagne bottle was placed between two spans to be broken during the locking. In May, the installation of glass panels began as well as repair of park space near the bridge that was cleared up for the construction.

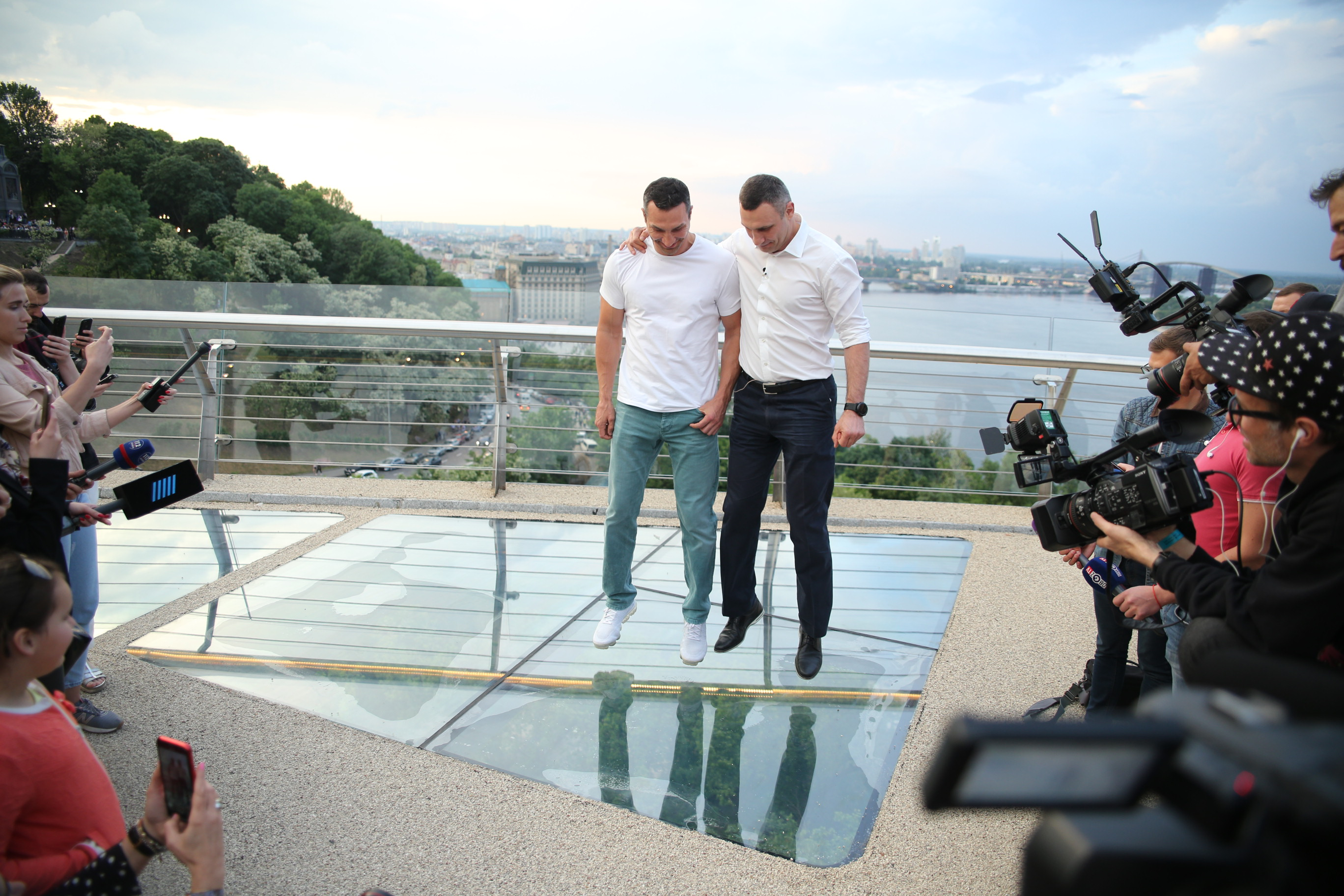
Klitschko brothers test the glass panel by jumping (25 May 2019)

On 25 May 2019 during the celebration of Day of Kyiv, the bridge was opened by Mayor of Kyiv Vitaly Klitschko and his brother Volodymyr, they've jumped on one of the glass panels several times to prove the safety of the structure. Vitaly stated that the construction lasted five months and was finished in time, he said that this work united all the Ukrainians as the workers from Zaporizhzhia, Dnipro, Lviv, Konotop, Rivne and Kyiv were involved in the construction working 24 hours a day.

On 13–14 June 2019, the bridge was closed to install the armored glass, apply the markings and clean up the bridge.

On 30 June 2019, additional security cameras had been installed on the bridge.

On 24 November 2021, in Saint Volodymyr Hill Park near the bridge, the bronze scale model of it was opened as a part of the program of popularization of tourism among the disabled people. The model has an information board in Ukrainian and English braille and a QR code for more information with sign language translation. The model has been approved by a head of All-Ukrainian Parliament of Working Disabled People Volodymyr Petrovskyi.

22 April 2025 Ukrainian household chemicals producer AFINA Group advertised their newly launched SARMIX brand by using it to clean the entire Glass Bridge.

== Criticism ==
=== UNESCO buffer zone concerns ===
When the bridge was under construction, Ukrainian Ministry of Culture sent a letter to Kyiv City State Administration to ask for canceling the project because of Volodymyr hills being an object of UNESCO Word Heritage. The administration refused to stop the construction stating that its location is outside of the Sofia Cathedral's buffer zone which makes it perfectly legal. In March 2019, Mayor of Kyiv Vitali Klitschko alongside director of Historical Heritage Olena Serdiuk had visited the UNESCO headquarters in Paris to present the project of Kyiv's tourist route and to prove the legality of the new bridge. UNESCO's consulting mission decided to visit Kyiv in April.

=== Plagiarism accusations ===
In May 2019, Swiss architect Stefanie M. Schafroth, the co-founder of Leuppi & Schafroth Architekten, stated that Andriy Myrhorodskyi from Project Systems LTD stole their project of the bridge that had won the contest back in 2013 for which they still didn't get their prize money promised by Kyiv. She also added that the cost of Swiss project was $6 million while the Ukrainian one increased it to $10 million. Andriy Myrhorodskyi called Stefanie's accusations 'utter nonsense' because his company was working on the footbridge project since 2010, making the plagiarism impossible in this situation. Andrii was supported by the transport infrastructure expert Viktor Petruk who made a detailed comparison of two projects in Facebook, where he had shown that while Andriy's project consisted of several strait spans, Stefanie's project had one S-shaped span. Viktor compared the accusations to looking for similarities between the jaguar ornament from Jaguar XK140 and the deer ornament from GAZ-21, where the deer is a Swiss project.

=== Corruption accusations ===
State Architecture and Construction Inspection refused to put the Glass Bridge into operation because Kyiv Prosecution Office was investigating the embezzlement of state funds during the construction, suspecting architects, construction contractors and Kyiv City State Administration.

In 2019, the Head of Office of the President Andriy Bohdan stated that he is contacting the law enforcement about the overpricing of the construction of Podilskyi Bridge, Shuliavskyi and Glass bridges and is asking the government to fire Vitaly Klitschko from Kyiv City State Administration. In response, Klitschko stated that the bridge had become an element of the political struggle against him. He also called the information about corruption a lie and stated that the takeover of authorities of the city administration oppose the European practice of city municipality.

On 5 July 2019, Vitaly Klitschko sued the owner of 1+1 TV channel Oleksandr Tkachenko for journalists 'manipulating' to lie about corruption during the construction of the bridge. Vitaly stated that the price of the bridge increased because it included the price of Saint Volodymyr Hill work.

On 18 February 2020, Vitaly Klitschko posted the results of the examinations at his Facebook page. The experts denied the embezzlement of state funds but instead proved the saving of 100 million hryvnias. The total cost of bridge construction and a reconstruction of the park had turned out to be 306 million, while at the stage of planning it was expected to be 420 million. In his post, he once again stated that all the accusations against him is an attempt of Servant of the People party to seize the control over the capital city.

=== Safety concerns ===
On 4 June 2019, architect Andriy Myrhorodskyi admitted that the construction process was rushed to be over in time for Kyiv Day and said that the opening ceremony had to be held several weeks after completion of construction for asphalt to be ready. However, when one of the transparent sections was damaged soon after the opening, he blamed the 'bastards' who were testing the glass strength despite it being temporary anyway.

In July 2019, Mostovyi Tsentr research and production enterprise was ordered to test the bridge's safety by Kyiv City State Administration. According to the results, the bridge was serviceable and met the current standards of pedestrian bridges load. Results were published on the Administration's website.

In March 2024, one of the glass panels cracked. 1+1 TV channel's Television Service of News interviewed the director of Instytut Mista analytics and research center Oleksandr Serhiienko who stated that only first of three glass layers received damage and it was caused by oscillations and temperature drops rather than vandalism.

=== Construction mistake accusations ===
On 28 January 2024, ICOMOS expert Olha Rutkovska stated that one of the piers of the bridge is misplaced interfering with the Khreshchatyk brook that flows in the underground collector which causes a soil subsidence at Poshtova Square where reconstruction was on hold due to the dispute with archaeologists.

In April, head of Servant of the People fraction Andriy Vitrenko during session of Kyiv City State Administration stated that due to the constructions nearby, Poshtova Square's heritage site is under threat of collapse and soil erosion of Saint Volodymyr Hill is possible.

On 28 April, Andriy Myrhorodskyi, who is the author of both Glass Bridge and Poshtova Square, stated that the real reason of subsidence are temporary piers of the square which were installed back in 2010s and were meant to serve several months, but with the conflict over the underground mall leading to construction interruption, they are now way over their limits and the square may collapse any time.

== Accidents ==
=== Vandalism ===
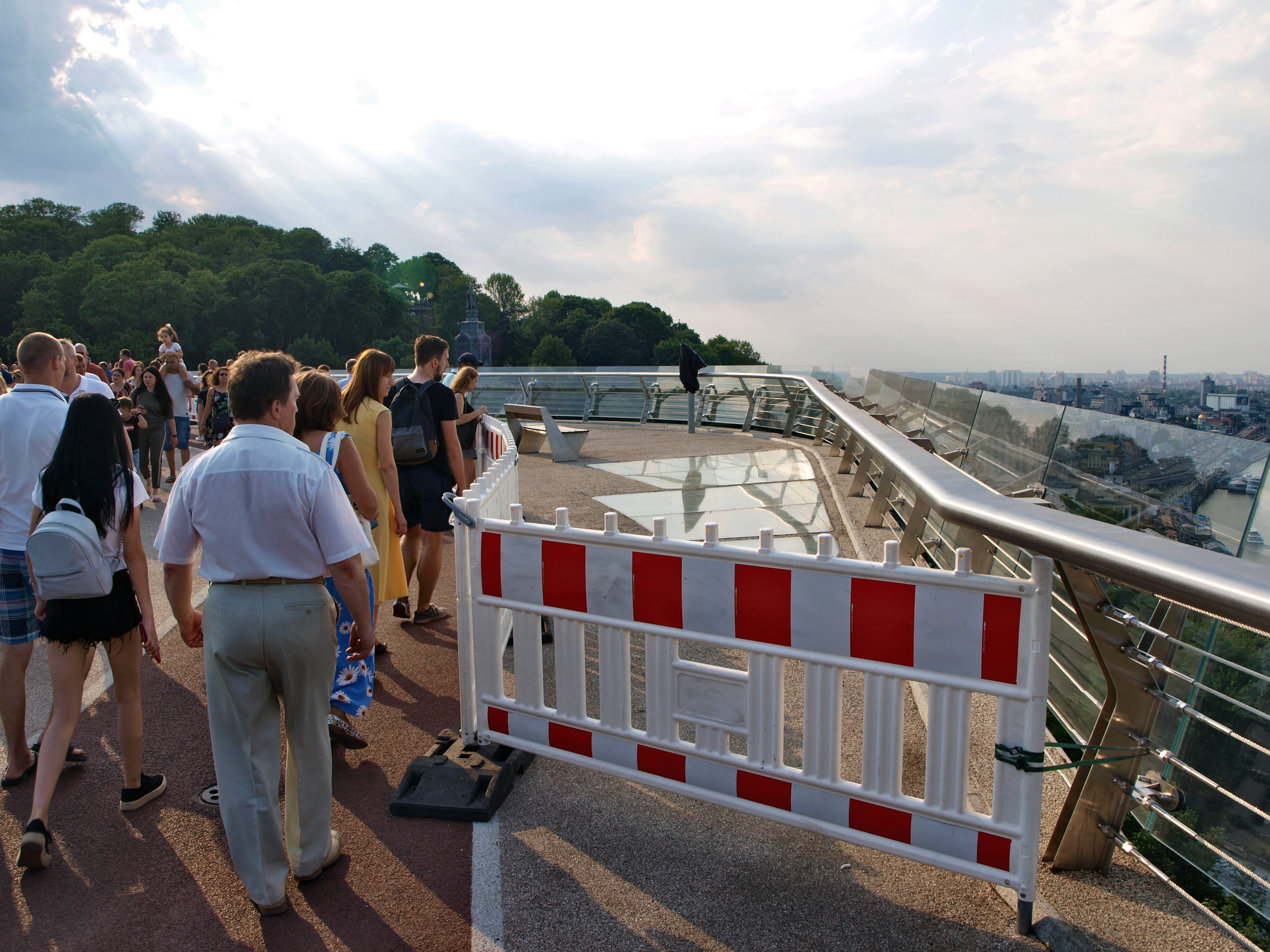
Viewing platforms fenced for the repair work (22 June 2019)

The first act of vandalism on the bridge in the very first night after its opening. On 26 May 2019, two glass panels got cracked. Originally, it was supposed that they were shot with rifles from underneath, but the Municipal Guard stated that it was a result of a 'group of unknown people actively jumping on it'. That day, Mayor of Kyiv Vitali Klitschko inspected the damage with experts and said that it is only a protective layer that got damaged and the glass itself is unharmed, he said that the repair work will take only one day. The next day, during the repair work, the third panel for unknown reasons got cracked, some people noticed the poor quality of reinstallation, there was dirt between the glass layers and gaps were between the panels.

On 29 July 2019, the glass railings of the bridge got cracked for an unknown reason. Kyiv City State Administration stated that the panel would be dismantled 31 July to be sent to examination to define the reason of the accident. The experts would also examine the material from the surveillance cameras. The viewing platforms of the bridge had been reopened 16 September.

In May 2020, the glass cracked once again and was fenced for repair work.

On 25 November 2020, vandals attempted to steal the observation binoculars from the bridge; however, after being noticed by the Municipal Guard, they threw it away and escaped.

On 18 December 2020, one of the glass panels cracked. Kyiv City State Administration stated that the repair was being conducted by the original contractor, and no city funds had been spent on it.

In February 2021, two glass panels of the bridge got cracked. They had been replaced in May.

On 29 July 2021, an information sign at the bridge got cracked. Examining the surveillance video, police identified the criminal to be a 1997-born man from Lutsk and arrested him. He said that he came to Kyiv for recreation and called his actions an accident because he just wanted to test the sign's strength. He was sentenced to five years in jail for hooliganism.

On 4 January 2022, the Municipal Guard discovered that the glass railing got cracked again during the holidays.

6 December 2024 surveillance recorded vandals damaging the glass on the bridge. 4 March 2025 Kyiv City State Administration informed that the glass would be replaced as soon as the temperature stabilizes, as the repair work requires it to be no lower than +10°C. 23 April 2025 the glass was replaced by Kyivavtoshliakhmist.

=== Automobile trespassing ===
On 17 June 2019, a Mercedes ML drove through the bridge despite the cars being banned from accessing a pedestrian zone. Police found the vehicle owner by a number plate and charged him with a 400 hryvnias fine.

Another trespassing happened in February 2020. A group of young people listening to Russian rap in their car drove through the pedestrian bridge in the night while filming it on camera.

=== Suicide attempts ===
In the morning of 2 May 2024 a 30 years old woman tried jumping off the bridge, she was interrupted by the Municipal Guard officer and taken to the hospital.

10 July 2024 a man jumped off the bridge and died instantly.

=== Attacks during Russian invasion of Ukraine ===
Surveillance footage of Russian missile strike

As part of the 10 October 2022 missile strikes during the Russian invasion of Ukraine, a Russian Kh-101 missile fell near the bridge's pillar, but the bridge survived with minor damage. During the attack, the only person that was on the bridge managed to survive and escape unhurt, he was the first person to take the photos of the missile's remains. Television Service of News found and interviewed the man on 13 October.

The place of attack was inspected by the Deputy Head of the Presidential Administration Kyrylo Tymoshenko who stated that the attack was targeted on a civilian object only to scare Ukrainians. On 11 October 2022, Vitali Klitschko, the mayor of Kyiv, said that repairs are already underway. On 17 December 2022, the bridge reopened with all 18 floor glass units as well as 143 side glasses replaced.

The bridge became a symbol of endurance among Kyivans in comparison to the controversial Crimean Bridge that got damaged by the SBU earlier that month. On 13 October 2022, Vitali Klitschko launched a merchandise line with a picture of the Glass Bridge and a tagline 'To withstand is not to fall'. On 18 November 2022, the participants of the Smart City Expo World Congress in Barcelona received a souvenir with pieces of glass from the bridge and an inscription 'The bridge has endured, Kyiv has endured, and Ukraine will endure!'. On 10 May 2023, another piece of glass from the bridge was sold from Prozorro's charity auction; received money was used to fund Kyiv's newly formed rifle battalion.

On the night of 28 May 2023, Kyiv suffered at the time the largest Shahed drone attack since the beginning of the war, with one explosion reportedly heard from the city center. The following morning, one cracked glass railing was discovered at the pedestrian bridge. Whether it was caused by the attack or not is unknown.

== In popular culture ==
On 21 October 2022, Ukrainian singer Wellboy released a music video for his new song 'Styl'. The video was shot in Kyiv and among the other locations featured the Shevchenko University Red Corps and the St. Volodymyr Descent Glass Bridge that were recently damaged by Russian missile strikes.

The bridge was featured on the broadcast of the Eurovision Song Contest 2023, as part of the "Postcard" for Australia's entry. It was shown alongside Perth's Matagarup Bridge and Bristol's Clifton Suspension Bridge.
