= Ukrainian House =

Convention center in Kyiv, Ukraine

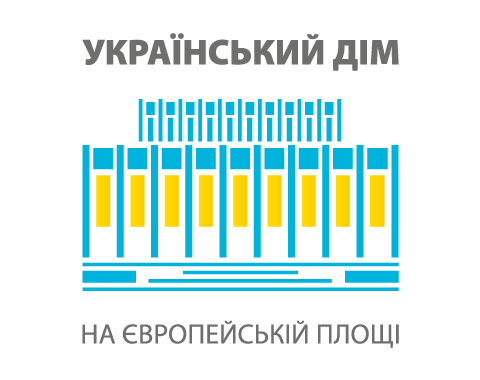

- Interactive map of Ukrainian House
- Former names: All-Union Lenin Museum (1982 - 1993)
- Location: Shevchenko Raion, Kyiv, Ukraine
- Coordinates: 50°27′11″N 30°31′37″E
- Operator: National center of business and cultural cooperation

Construction
- Built: 1978–1982

Website
- Official website

The Ukrainian House International Convention Center (Ukrainian: Міжнародний конгрес-центр «Український дім», romanized: Mizhnarodnyi konhres-tsentr «Ukrainskyi dim»), is the largest international exhibition and convention center in Kyiv, Ukraine. The five-storey building is the host venue for a variety of events from exhibitions, trade fairs and conferences to international association meetings, product launches, banquets, TV-ceremonies, sporting events, etc.

== Location ==
Ukrainian House is situated at 2 Khreshchatyk, overlooking European Square in the heart of the Ukrainian capital. The rear of the center adjoins the southern outskirts of Saint Volodymyr Hill Park. The building is not far from the main square of the country — Maidan Nezalezhnosti, as well as Dnipro Hotel, Khreschatyk Hotel and Hotel Ukraine.

Visitors can easily reach the Ukrainian House by any public transport, including the Kyiv Metro. On-site parking space is also available. All major attractions of the city are within walking distance from the center such as Maidan Nezalezhnosti, Saint Sophia Cathedral, St. Michael's Golden-Domed Monastery, Andriivskyi Descent with souvenirs, and numerous shopping centers, fine restaurants and hotels.

== History and use ==
Built in 1978–1982, this monumental building was originally erected as a Kyiv affiliate of the All-Union Lenin Museum, displaying materials documenting Lenin's life. The building was designed and built by the "Chief Kyiv Project" architects group led by Vadym Hopkalo, with assistance from Vadym Hrechyna, Volodymyr Kolomiyets, and Leonid Filenko. In 1985 the authors of the project received the Shevchenko State Prize of the Ukrainian SSR.

Since 1938 the Kyiv city exhibition of the All-Union Lenin Museum was located in Teacher House at 57 Volodymyr Street. The museum was moved to the Ukrainian House building when it was opened in 1982, where it remained until after the dissolution of the Soviet Union. On April 2, 1993, the building was renamed and converted to a conference and exhibition hall. The Lenin museum exhibition was dismounted and placed into storage funds.

In 2004 the entire collection of the Museum of the History of Kyiv was moved from its location at the Klov Palace to the fourth and fifth floor of Ukrainian House, where much of the collection remains to this day.

== Operations today ==
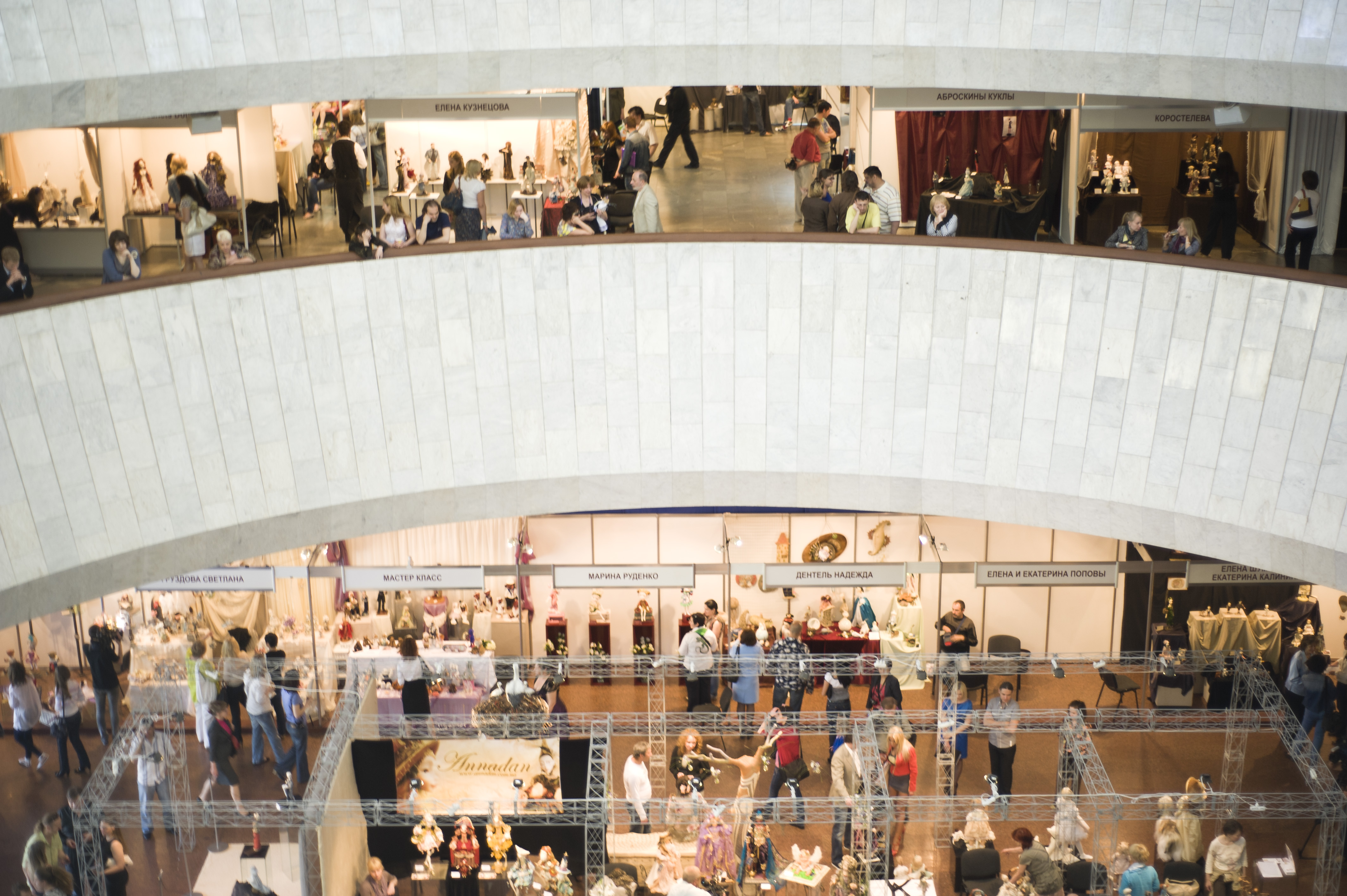
Internal view of the building during the "Kyiv Kazka" doll trade fair.

Today, the Government company National Center of Business and Cultural Cooperation "Ukrainian House" (part of the State Management of Affairs agency) owns the structure and arranges concerts, cultural festivals, local exhibitions, conferences, conventions, trade fairs, symposiums etc.

Ukrainian House has 5 storeys with fully flexible spaces and halls to fit any needs, from small private meetings to large-scale gatherings for up to 3,500 participants. It has all the necessary facilities from conference halls, exhibition spaces and auditoriums to an on-site restaurant and outdoor terraces.

Soviet-era bas-reliefs at the Ukrainian House; removed in August 2016 (to comply with decommunization laws) and transferred to the Museum of Totalitarianism

In August 2016 the Soviet-era bas-reliefs were removed from the building to comply with decommunization laws.

== Euromaidan protests ==
Ukrainian House was taken over in December 2013 by the Berkut special police forces during the Euromaidan protests. There were claims that the Berkut unit ransacked the building and possibly pilfered some of the museum collection.

On the 25th of January 2014 the House was besieged by Euromaidan protesters. After a long confrontation the police launched a counterattack on the main barricades and many retreated in order to secure the barricades but a number stayed. At around 11pm GMT, a truce was called where no side attacked each other. A long bout of negotiation followed. The final result being the 200 police officers still inside leaving through a side window.

When the Euromaidan protestors gained control over the Ukrainian House, it provided a community shelter for fellow civilians and protestors who were engaging in the revolution. The Ukraine House center provides free legal advice, a place to sleep, medical care, travel information, and psychiatric help. With all the chaos that was happening during this struggle, one couple, Viktor Bisovetskyi and his wife, Inna, joined the occupants of the building and opened a library during this anti-government movement known as Euromaidan. Since most of the space was occupied, the couple found a room in the corner of the basement. There, countless librarians, friends, and civilians donated books, travel guides, magazines and philosophy texts to this library.

As of late March 2014 and the annexation of Crimea by the Russian Federation and masked Russian invasion of eastern Ukraine, the Ukrainian House is acting as a base for the "Self-defense of the Maidan", one of the major Euromaidan militias. It was concurrently an assembly area and public relations coordination site for the National Guard of Ukraine.

== See also ==
- Euromaidan
