= Kolomiets =

Kolomiets (also Kolomiyets) is a patronymic surname of Slavic origin. Russified variant: Kolomoiets. The word literally mean "a person from Kolomyia". Notable people with the surname include:

- Alina Kolomiets (born 2006), Bulgarian rhythmic gymnast
- Inna Kolomiets (1921–2005), Ukrainian sculptor
- Marina Kolomiets (born 1972), Russian footballer
- Olga Kolomiyets (born 1973), Ukrainian volleyball player
- Trofim Kolomiets (1894–1971), Soviet Army commander
