= 1500th anniversary of Kiev =

1982 commemoration in Soviet Ukraine

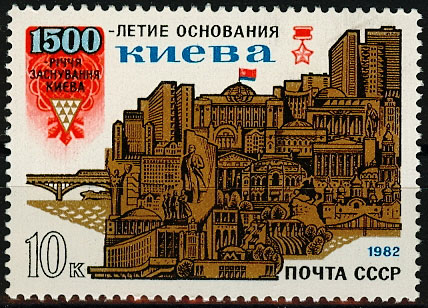
- Soviet postage stamp from 1982 commemorating the anniversary
- Native name: Святкування 1500-річчя Києва
- Date: 1982 (44 years ago)
- Location: Kiev (Kyiv), Ukrainian SSR, USSR

The 1500th anniversary of Kiev, the capital of the Ukrainian SSR, was an event held in 1982. Although archaeologists have found evidence that Kiev (present-day Kyiv) was founded in either the 6th or 7th century, and the settlement may have been mentioned in documents more than two millennia ago, the observance of the 1500th anniversary in 1982 is based on a now traditional founding date of AD 482 for the city.

== Development of the idea ==
There are several contradictory versions of who in the second half of the 1970s came up with the idea of celebrating an anniversary of Kiev. Amongst the alleged initiators are the names of Petro Tronko (vice-premier of the Ukrainian SSR and famous historian), Halyna Menzheres (deputy mayor of Kiev, who had attended the celebration of Yerevan's jubilee), and Valentyn Zghursky (mayor of Kiev in 1979; he himself claimed credit for the idea in many interviews). What is clear is that the city council of Kiev requested permission to organise an event to celebrate this anniversary, which was approved by the Council of Ministers of the Ukrainian SSR; the city council just had to determine how old Kiev actually was first.

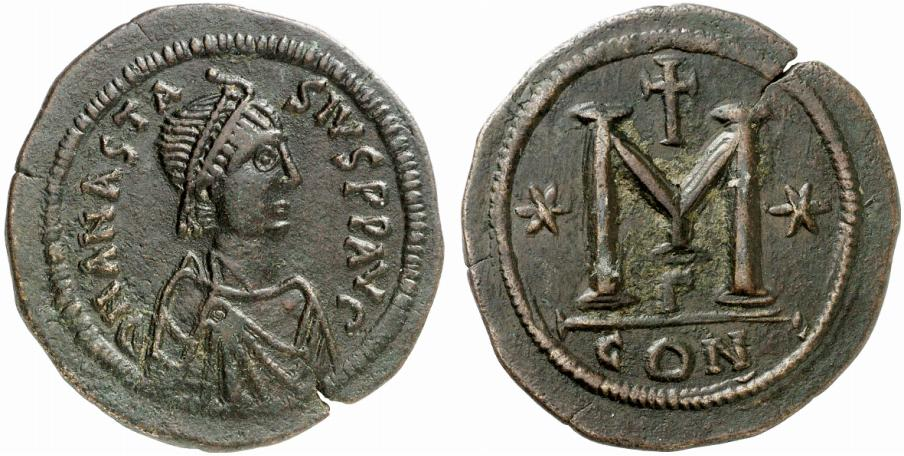
Example of a Roman follis coin of Anastasius I Dicorus, one of which was found on Zamkova Hora

Zghursky then claimed that recently discovered manuscripts in the Matenadaran supposedly mentioned Kiev as a settlement 2,500 years ago, and sent documents of this to UNESCO in Paris. Its head replied that UNESCO does not celebrate days of cities; at most, it could consider recognising the formation date of the state of Kievan Rus'. The city council then offered to celebrate the 2000th anniversary of Kievan Rus' and Kiev, but the European experts at the UNESCO headquarters disagreed with the new date suggested. Another suggestion made previously by numismatists was basing the foundation on a Roman follis coin of Byzantine emperor Anastasius I Dicorus (r. 491–518) found in Zamkova Hora; this argument would eventually prove to be decisive. When a 1500-year-old anniversary was discussed, the chairman of the National Academy of Sciences of Ukraine Borys Paton who was also present half-jokingly told mayor Zghursky: "Hurry up and go to the podium and agree. Otherwise, they will cut off another few hundred years!" Zghursky did so, and apparently this is how UNESCO reached the official decision that Kiev was allowed to celebrate its '482 foundation' in 1982.

== Preparations and controversies ==
The age of Kiev thus having been determined and officially recognised by UNESCO, in July 1979, the city council of Kiev began planning the event celebrating a 1500th anniversary. In December 1979, the Council of Ministers of the Ukrainian SSR adopted a resolution on the reconstruction and construction of social and cultural facilities, and restoration of historical and cultural monuments, to coincide with the celebrations.

According to various versions of events that are difficult to verify, the leadership of the Soviet Union in Moscow was unhappy with the suggestion that the capital of one of its constituent republics was supposedly hundreds of years older than the Union's capital Moscow itself (first mentioned in documents in 1147; the city had celebrated its 800th anniversary in 1947). The back-and-forth negotiations between Moscow and Kiev, which according to Zghursky lasted two years in 1980 and 1981 and involved the exchange of "endless correspondence – memos, historical information, clarifications, etc.", revealed an ideological struggle rather than a scientific debate. Claims of some Kievan archaeologists that the earliest settlements at the site of modern Kiev might be as old as 3,000 years, proved to be too much of a stretch; the Muscovite Politburo demanded evidence of Kiev as a city (город), not just as a settlement (поселение). Nevertheless, it could hardly be denied that evidence from written sources pointed to Kiev definitely existing as a city by the 9th century at the latest. In the end, first secretary of the Ukrainian SSR Volodymyr Shcherbytsky would have persuaded USSR general secretary Leonid Brezhnev (himself also from Ukraine, and on good terms with Shcherbytsky) in a phone call to allow the plans for a 1500th anniversary to go ahead. Shcherbytsky commented: 'We will celebrate the 1500th anniversary during the lifetime of the current generation. And if the descendants decide that we were wrong, let them celebrate another anniversary.'

Thus, in the run-up to the event, the Soviet authorities claimed that the year 1982 simultaneously coincided with the 60th anniversary of the formation of the Soviet Union in 1922, as well as the alleged "1500th anniversary" of the legendary foundation of Kyiv by Kyi, Shchek and Khoryv in AD 482. Various scholars and commentators found "482" an odd attribution, as no such date is mentioned in the Primary Chronicle. Historian Taras Kuzio said that 'the year 482 had no special significance'. There was speculation that the two anniversaries were merged for the sake of convenience by the Soviet regime, to emphasise the common origins of Ukraine and Russia, and step around their many conflicts. Archaeologist and historian Petro Tolochko reasoned that the authorities seemed to be in a hurry to celebrate the 1500th anniversary, even though Kiev was in his view at most 1400 years old at that time. In 1981, historian Omeljan Pritsak (Harvard University) similarly wrote critically about the much-touted upcoming celebration, denying the claim that Kiev could have been founded in 482, as well as drawing attention to the ideological and political bias of the holiday. He suggested celebrating the Christianization of Kievan Rus' instead. Moreover, Pritsak contended the celebration of the high-profile anniversary was also designed to distract Ukrainians from another tragic anniversary: the 50th anniversary of the Holodomor, the deliberately caused famine in Ukraine in 1932–1933.

== Event and legacy ==
To celebrate the anniversary, many important monuments were restored, and new monuments, such as the Monument to the Founders of Kyiv and the Monument to Commemorate the Reunification of Ukraine with Russia, (Note: Official name of the monument in Soviet times: Monument to commemorate the reunification of Ukraine with Russia. After the restoration of Ukraine's independence until May 2022, the monument was renamed the Peoples' Friendship Arch (Ukrainian: Арка дружби народів, romanized: Arka druzhby narodiv), colloquial name was the Yarmo (Ukrainian: Ярмо́, lit. 'Yoke'). On 14 May 2022, according to the decision of the Kyiv City Council, it was named the Arch of Freedom of the Ukrainian people.) were constructed. The people of Kyiv enjoyed the festivities so much that Kyiv Day was established as an official holiday in 1987, commemorated on the last Sunday of May.

Despite the questionable claims about the supposed 1500-year age of the city, several politicians would go on to embrace 482 as the date of the legendary foundation, including former Kyivan mayor Oleksandr Omelchenko, who utilised it in order to argue the Ukrainian capital was much older than Moscow. The Monument to the Founders of Kyiv soon became iconic for the city and has been used as Kyiv's unofficial emblem. In 2001, another statue was installed at a fountain of the Maidan Nezalezhnosti.

== Gallery ==
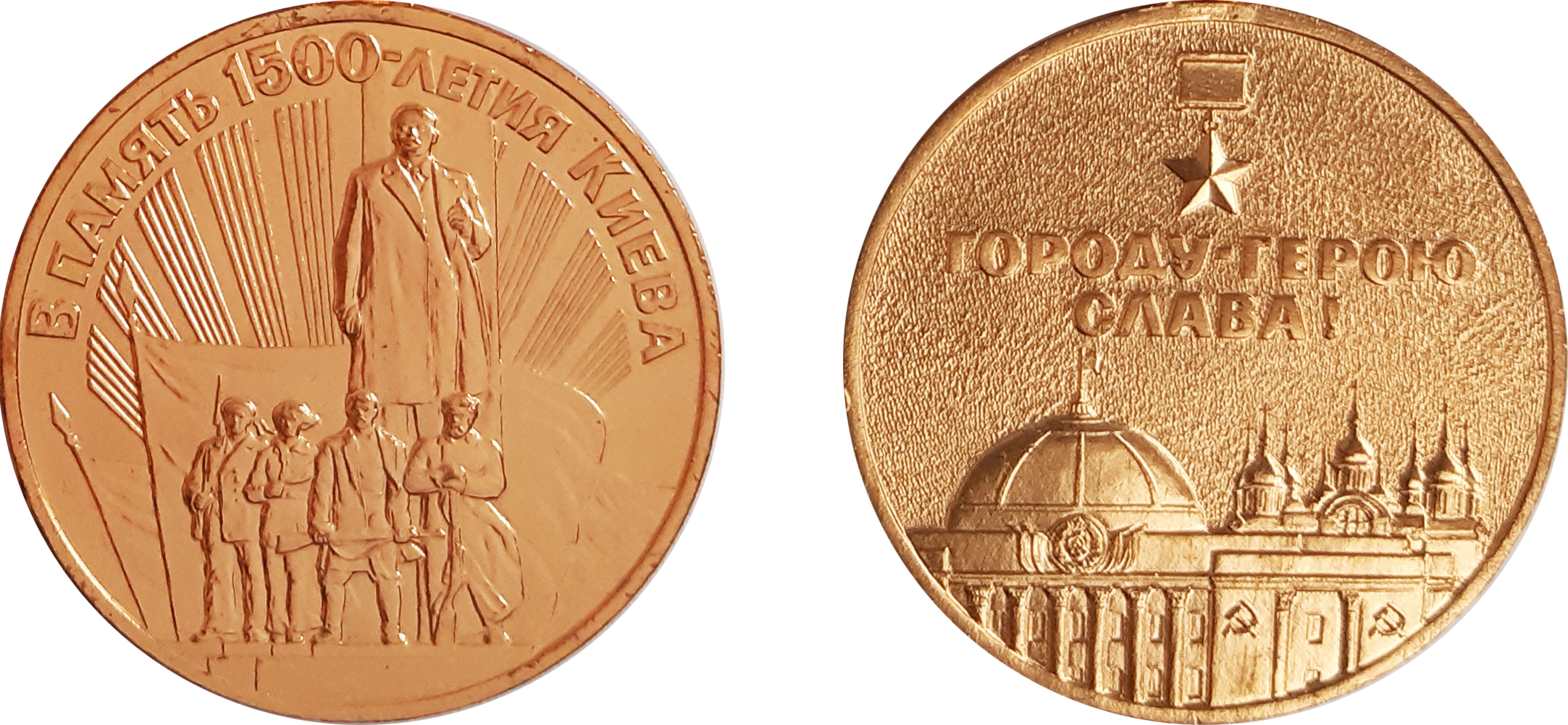
Reverse: Medal "In Commemoration of the 1500th Anniversary of Kiev". Obverse: "Glory to the Hero-City!", showing the 1977 Monument of the Great October Revolution in Kiev (dismantled in 1991 after Ukrainian independence)

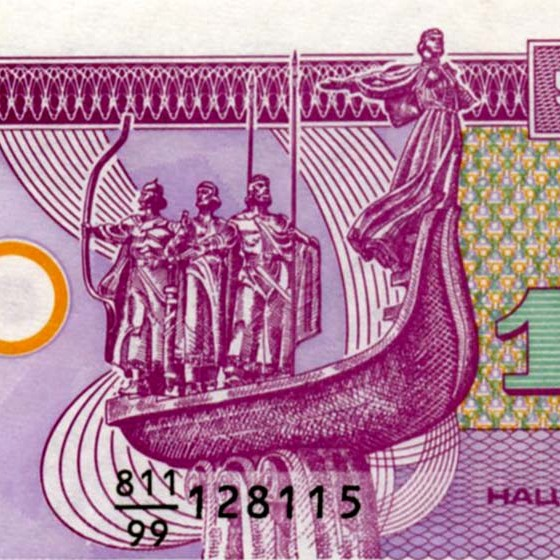
Monument to the Founders of Kyiv, as depicted on a series of Ukrainian banknotes from 1992

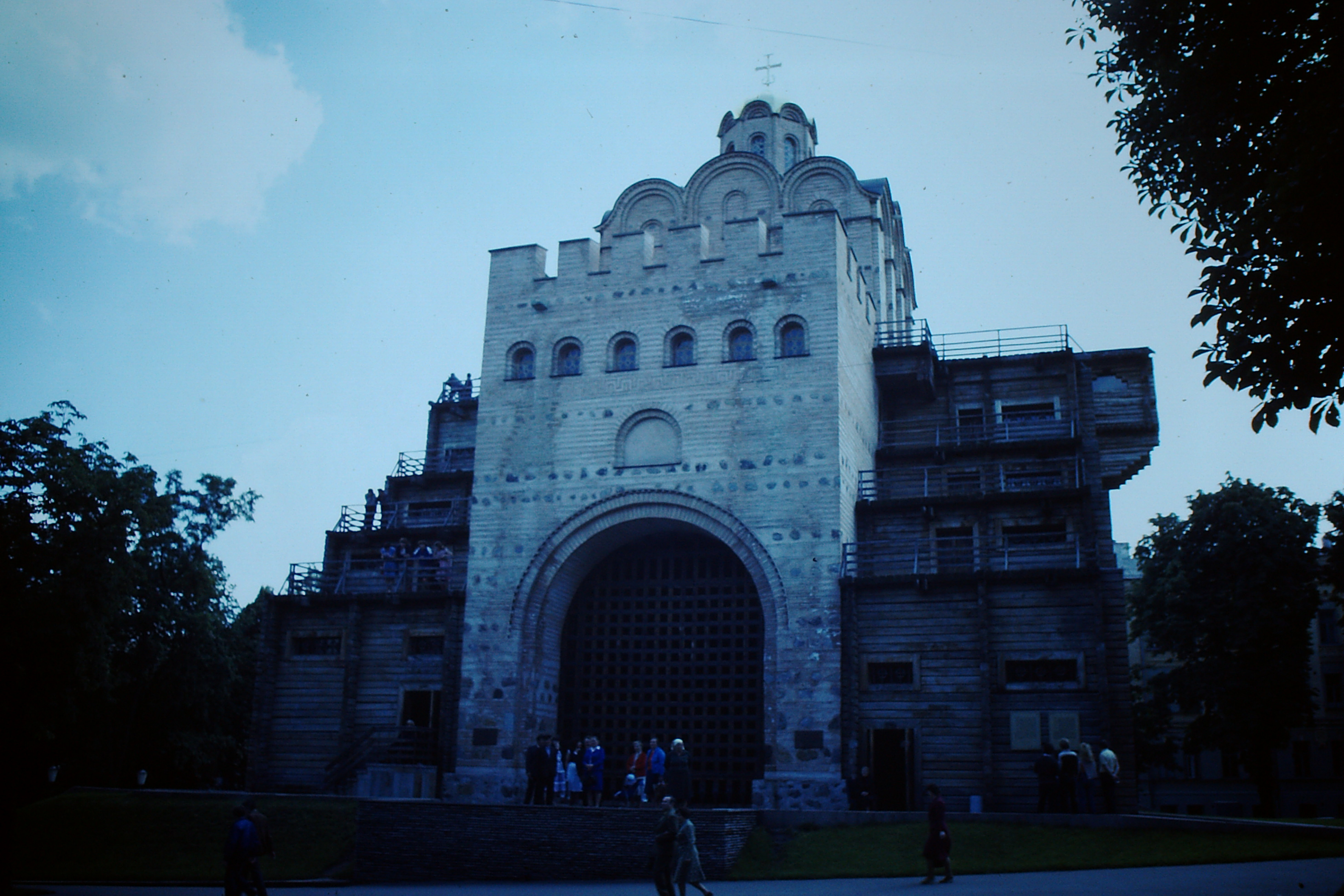
The Golden Gate of Kiev, controversially rebuilt for the event (pictured in 1984)

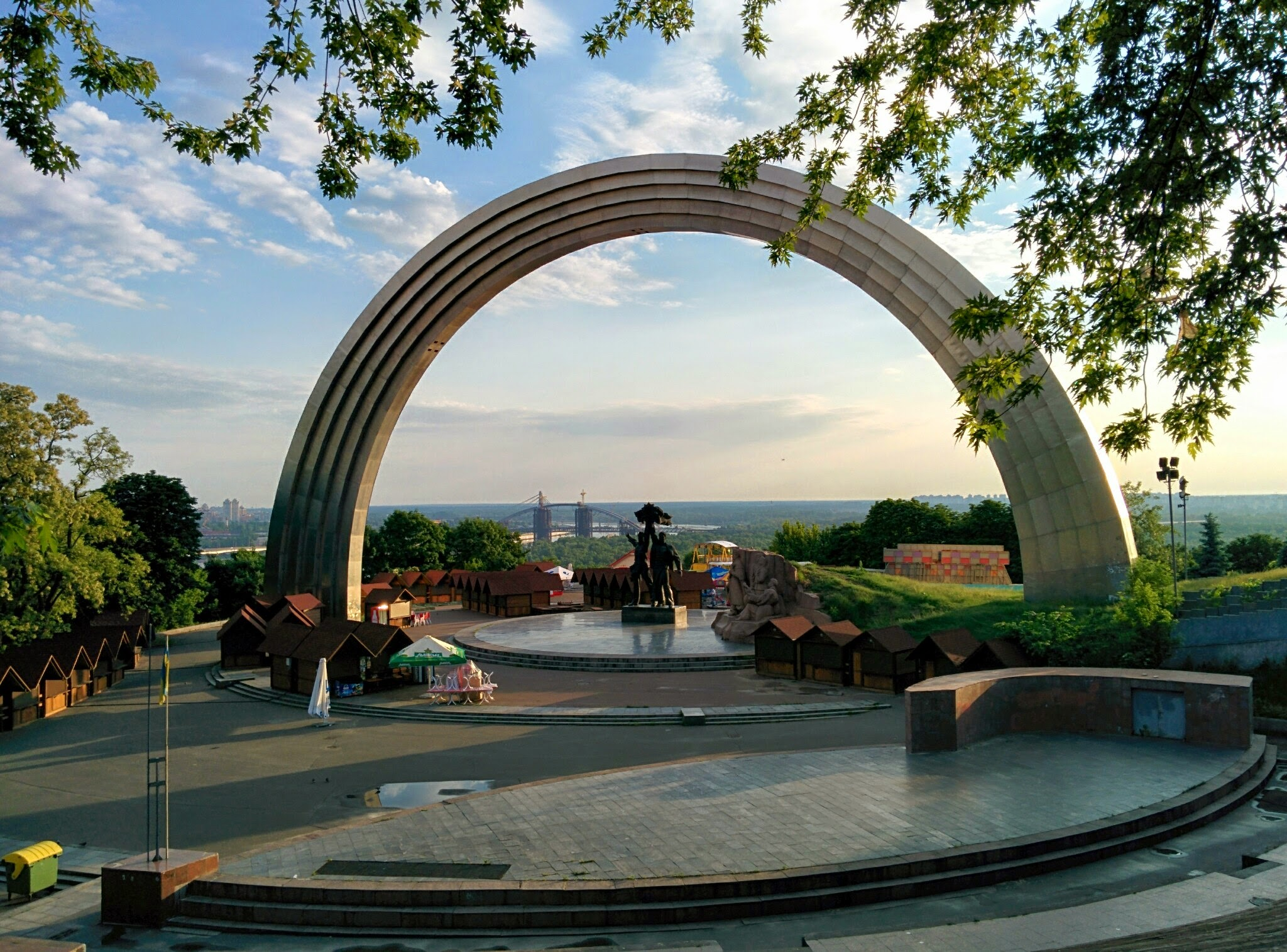
"Friendship Arch", renamed "Arch of Freedom of the Ukrainian People" in April 2022 after Russia's invasion of Ukraine (pictured in 2014)

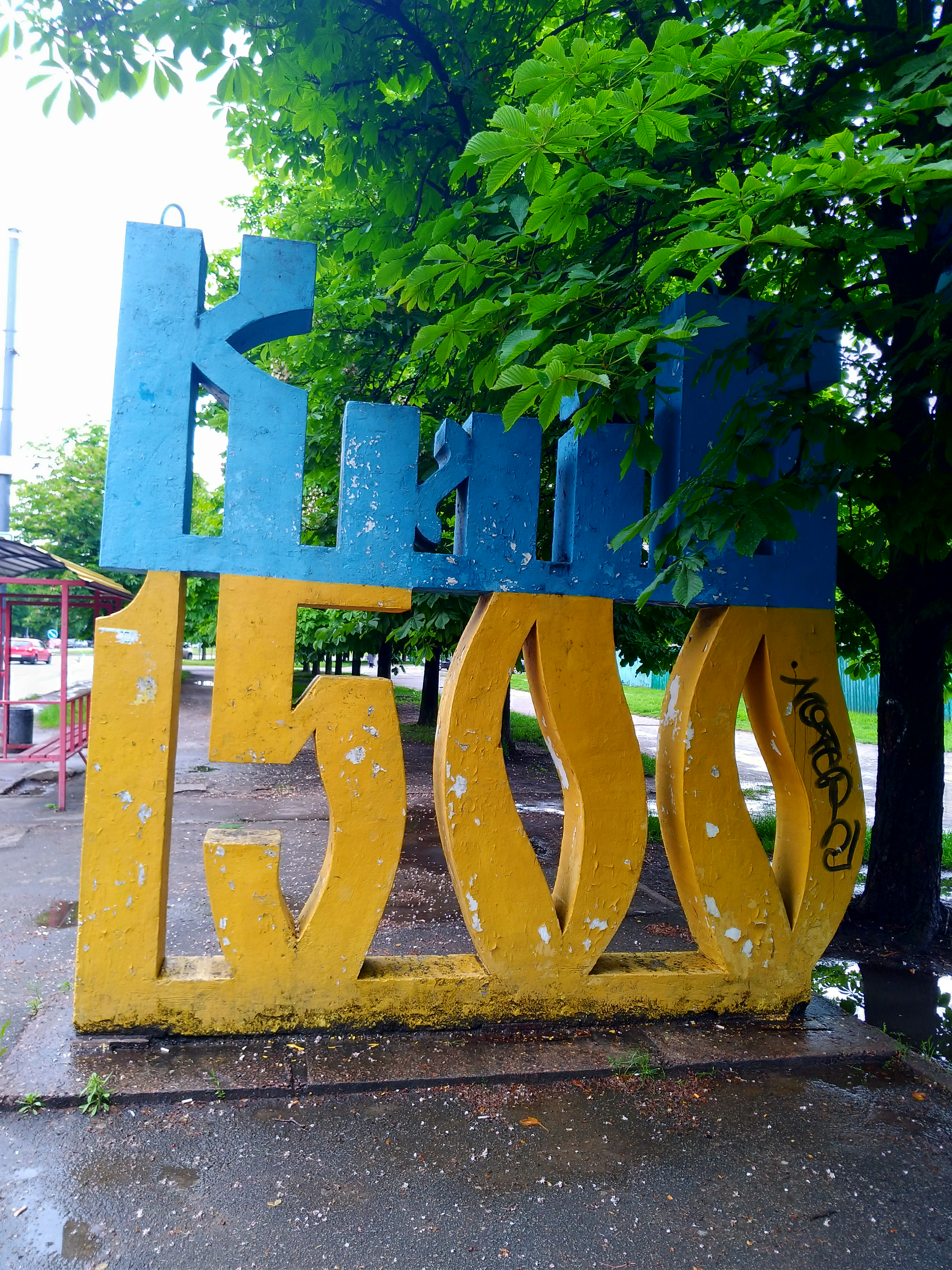
Monument commemorating the anniversary, on Jules Verne Boulevard in Kyiv (pictured in 2020)

== See also ==
- History of Kyiv
- Kyi, Shchek and Khoryv
- Kyiv: An Encyclopedic Handbook (1981, prepared for the 1500th anniversary)

== Literature ==
- Gunnarsson, Valur (7 January 2021). Origin Stories: The Kyivan Rus in Ukrainian Historiography. Skemman (Thesis).
- Pritsak, Omeljan (1981). "За кулісами проголошення 1500-ліття Києва" [Behind the scenes of the 1500th anniversary of Kyiv] (PDF). Сучасність (in Ukrainian) (9): 49–53. Archived from the original (PDF) on 17 October 2020.
- Tsalyk, Stanislav (28 May 2016). "1982 рік: як рахували вік Києва" [1982: how the age of Kyiv was calculated]. BBC News Україна (in Ukrainian).
