= Monument to the Founders of Kyiv =

Concrete and copper statue by the Dnipro

- Пам'ятний знак на честь заснування міста Києва
- Interactive map of Monument to the Founders of Kyiv
- Location: Navodnytskyi Park, Kyiv, Ukraine
- Coordinates: 50.4291°N 30.5689°E
- Completion date: 22 May 1982 (44 years ago)
- Restored date: 28 May 2010 (16 years ago)

The Monument to the Founders of Kyiv (Ukrainian: Пам'ятний знак на честь заснування міста Києва, romanized: Pamiatnyi znak na chest zasnuvannia mista Kyieva) is a statue located on the banks of the river Dnipro in Navodnytskyi Park, Kyiv, Ukraine. It was designed by sculptor Vasyl Borodai, and created to commemorate the 1500th anniversary of Kyiv. (Note: The observance of the 1500th anniversary in 1982 is based on a traditional founding date of 482 for Kyiv, even though archaeologists have found evidence that the city was founded in either the 6th or 7th century.) The monument was constructed with reinforced concrete and covered in copper leaf. Completed in 1982, it partially collapsed in 2010, but was restored within a few months. The monument is considered a symbol of Kyiv.

== Description ==
The monument depicts siblings Kyi, Shchek, Khoryv, and Lybid, the legendary founders of Kyiv. The four figures stand in a boat, with sister Lybid at the bow with her arms outstretched, while the three brothers are crowded together near the stern holding their weapons, two long thin spears and a bow. The boat rests atop a granite pedestal representing three waves, which itself lies on a platform of red granite. A fountain is located next to the monument, featuring coloured lights and jets of water up to 3.5 m (11 ft) high.

Borodai based the face of Lybid on that of his daughter, Halyna Borodai, who died at the age of 31.

== History ==
External images
- Monument without two of the brothers
- The monument and fountain lit at night

To commemorate the 1500th anniversary of Kyiv, a number of construction projects were undertaken, including the building of Ukrainian House, the restoration of the Golden Gate, and the raising of this monument to the city's founders. The monument was constructed with reinforced concrete and covered in copper leaf because the Central Committee of the Communist Party of the Soviet Union ordered that nonferrous metals not be used due to financial considerations after the 1980 Summer Olympics. The statue received a favourable reception from Kyivans when it was inaugurated on 22 May 1982.

The monument collapsed partially in 2010, but was restored later that year. It was selected as the logo to represent the city during the UEFA Euro 2012 football tournament, for which Kyiv was one of the hosts. In 2021, Navodnytskyi Park was renovated, and Vitali Klitschko, Mayor of Kyiv, opened a fountain next to the monument. (Note: The monument was originally located next to a simple pool.) During the 2022 Russian invasion of Ukraine, it was amongst the city's monuments that were protected with sandbags or plywood.

== Restoration ==
During the evening of 23 February 2010, it was reported that the rear of the monument, including two of the figures, had collapsed. The weather had taken its toll on the sculpture, and the metal frame had completely rotted. The Kyiv City State Administration stated its intention to restore the monument, and at one point, an official of the administration reported that the monument would be replaced by a bronze copy of the original.

Three months and five days after the collapse, on the afternoon of 28 May, Mayor Leonid Chernovetskyi inaugurated the restored monument in a solemn ceremony, in time for Kyiv Day. (Note: Mayor Chernovetskyi momentarily stumbled over the names of the city's legendary founders during his speech, but corrected himself shortly afterward. Valentyn Zghursky, who had served as the head of the Kyiv City Executive Committee for more than a decade, followed with his speech, in which he forgot the names of Kyi and Khoryv altogether.) The middle of the monument had been reconstructed with waterproof concrete, and a drainage system was added. The restoration work had cost ₴400 million, and the monument was then predicted to last for at least a century.

== Monument in Maidan Nezalezhnosti ==
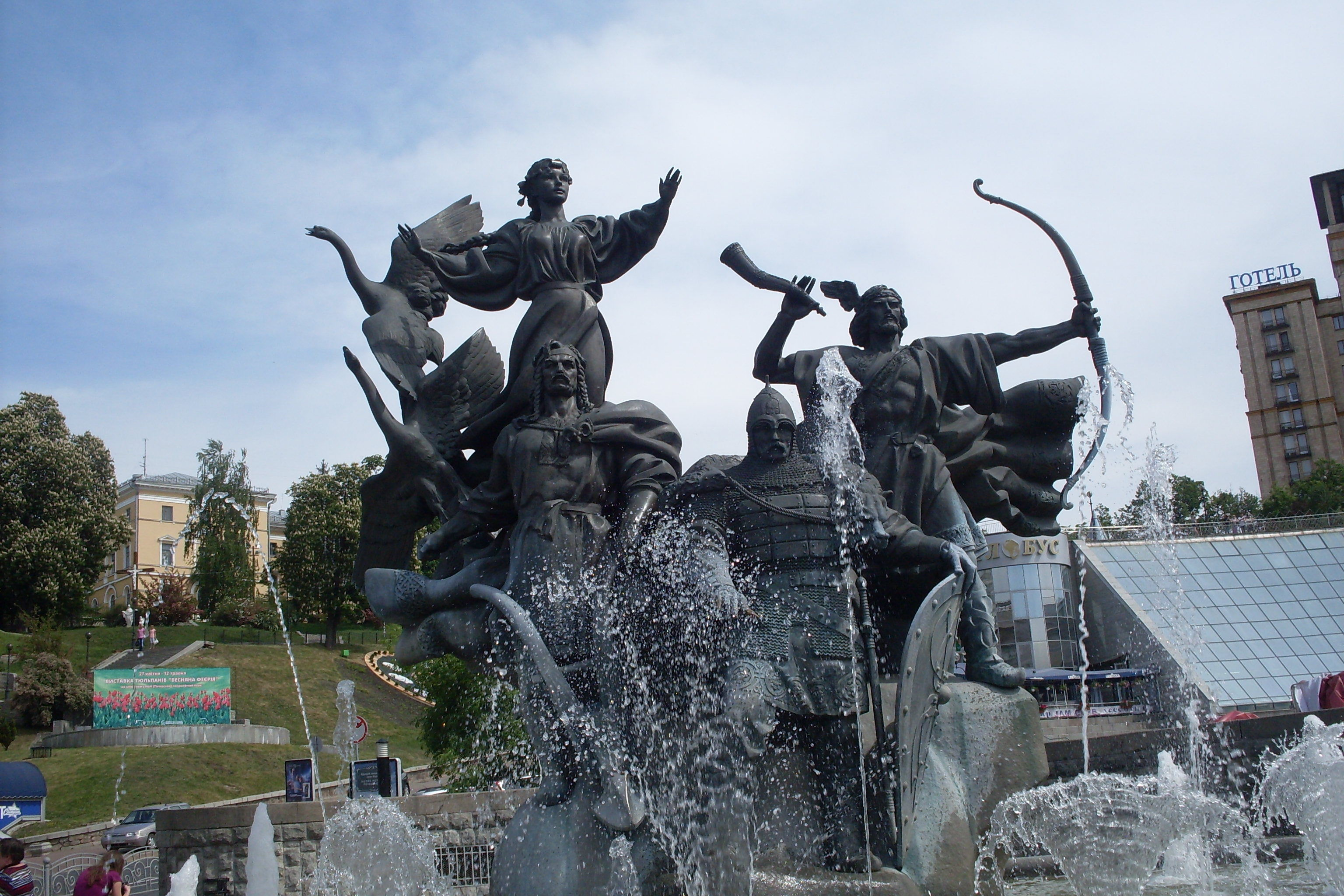
Kushch monument to the founders in Maidan Nezalezhnosti, inaugurated in 2001 (pictured 2008)

On 21 November 2001, a different monument to the founders of Kyiv was inaugurated at Maidan Nezalezhnosti. Designed by sculptor Anatolii Kushch, the monument in Maidan Nezalezhnosti also features Kyi, Shchek, Khoryv, and Lybid', but has a completely different composition.

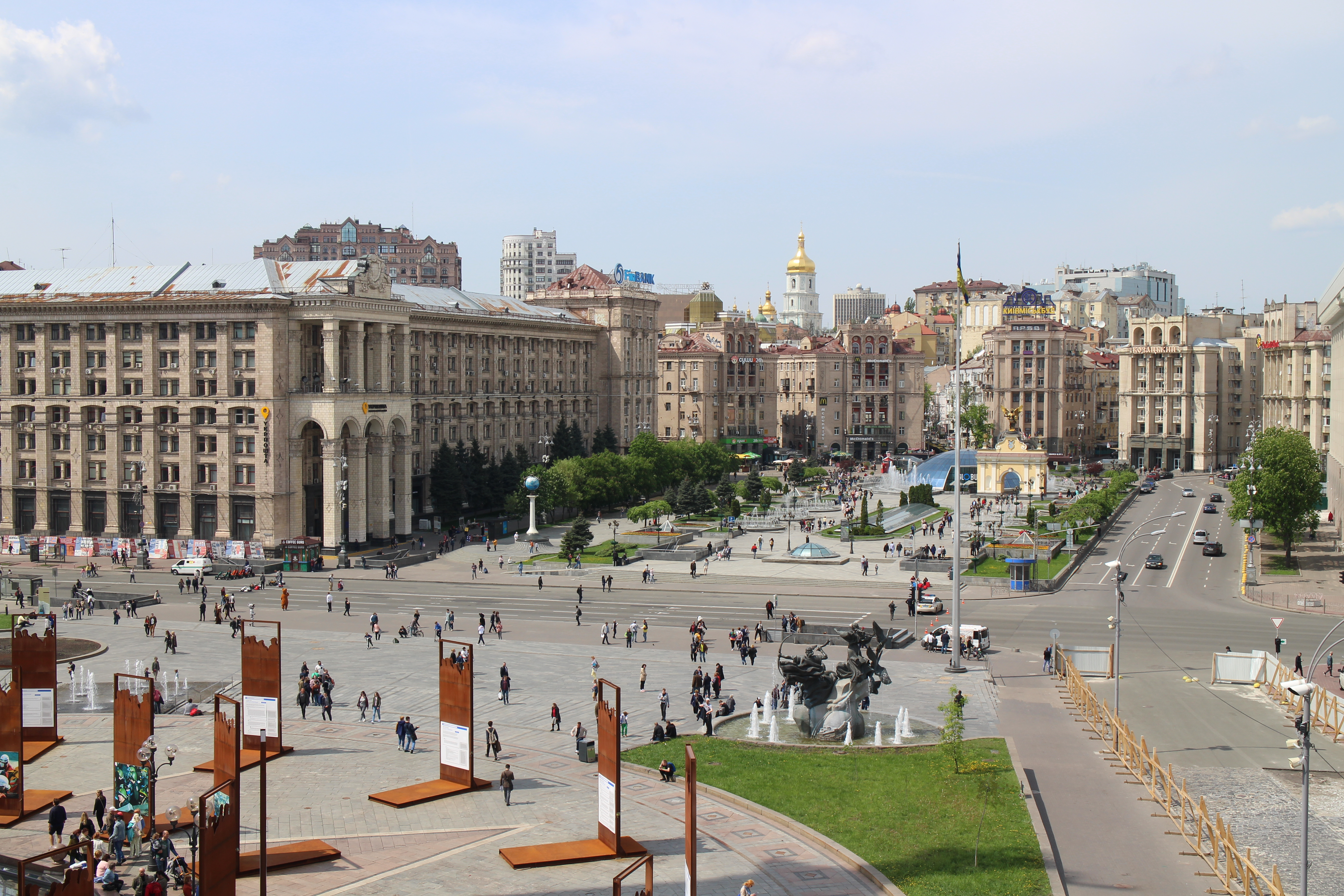
Rear view with the fountain, near a corner of the square's intersection (pictured 2019)

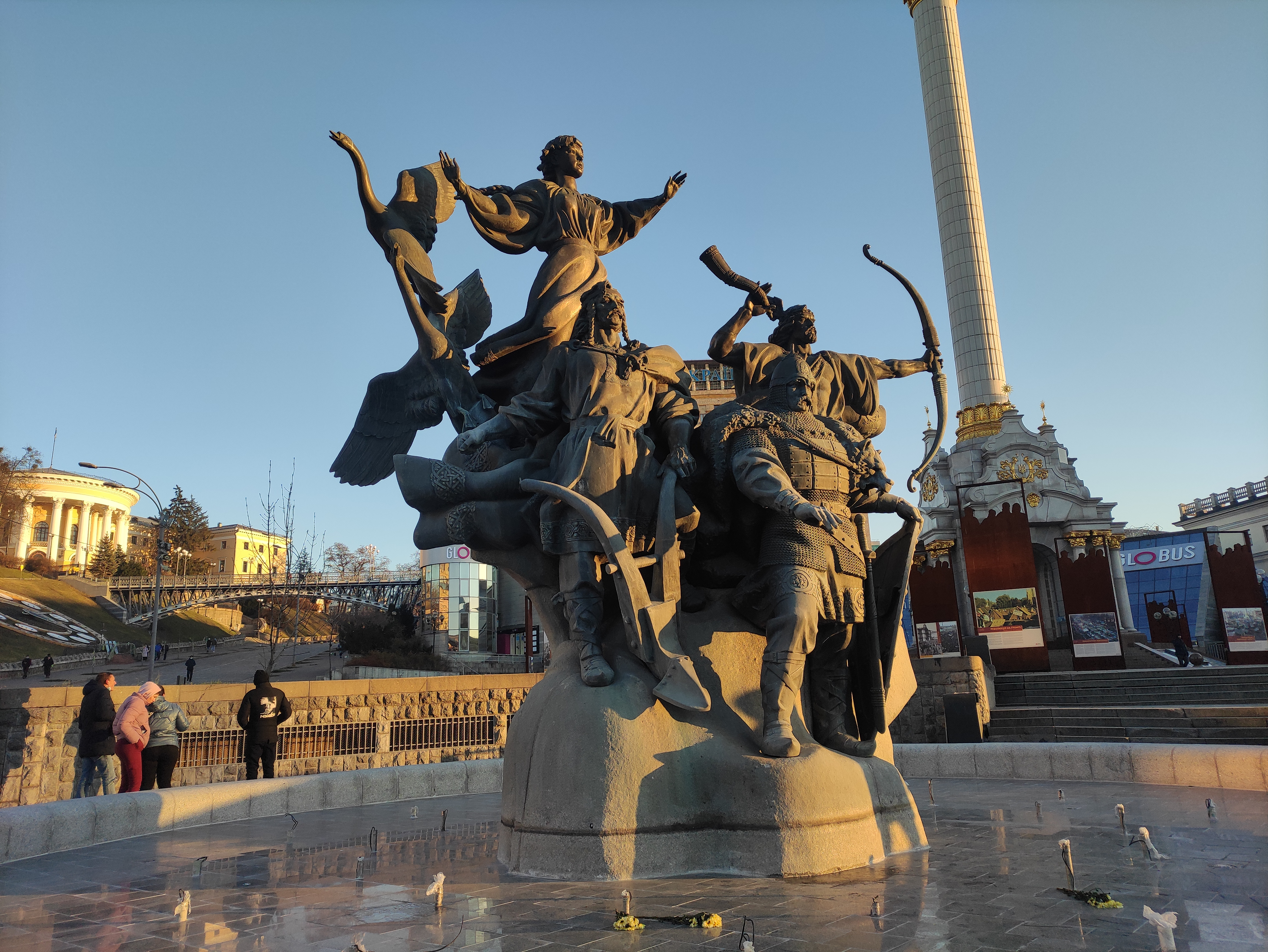
From a different angle, in the afternoon sun (pictured 2020)

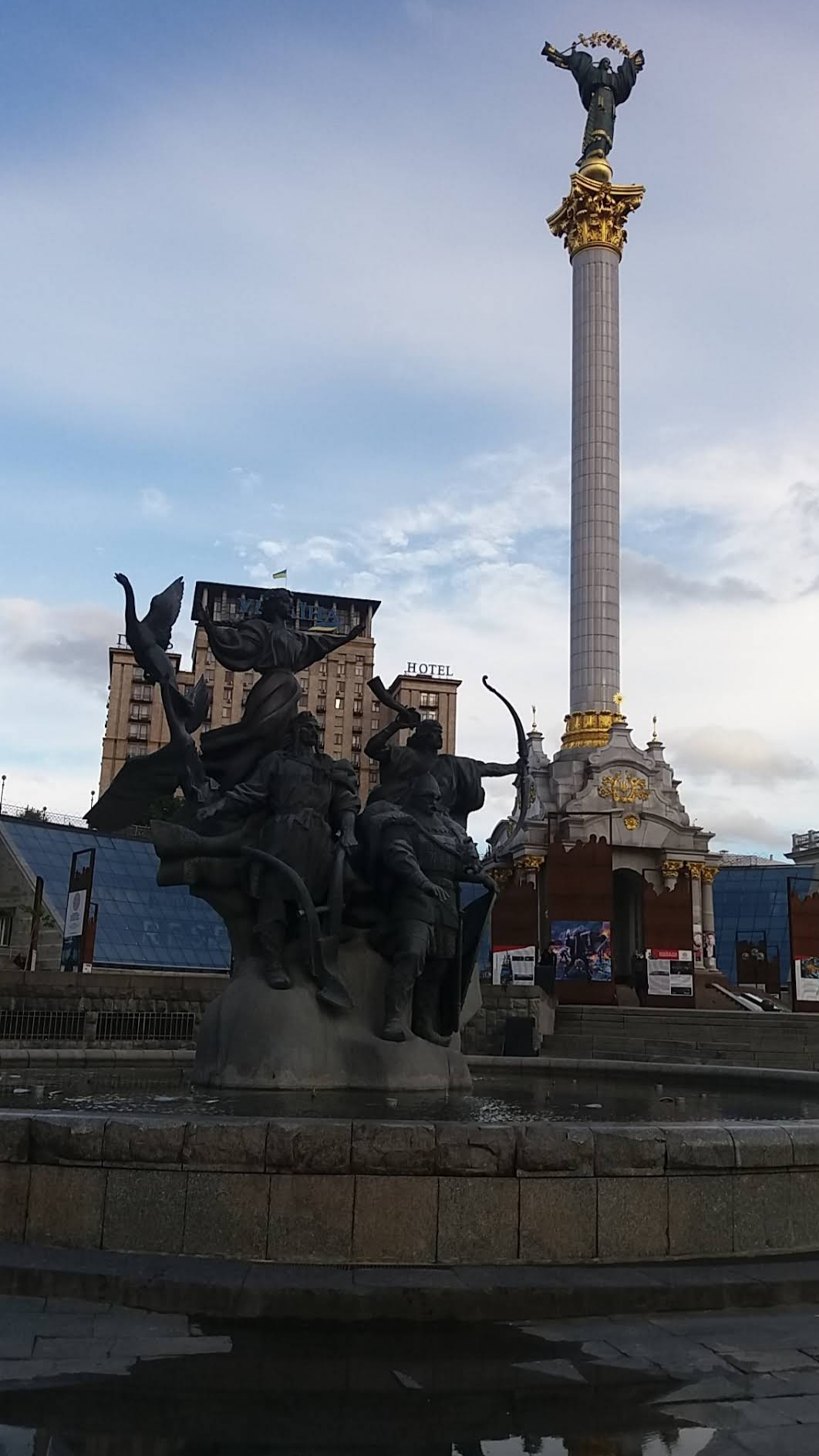
With Independence Monument, Kyiv in the background (pictured 2020)

== Gallery ==
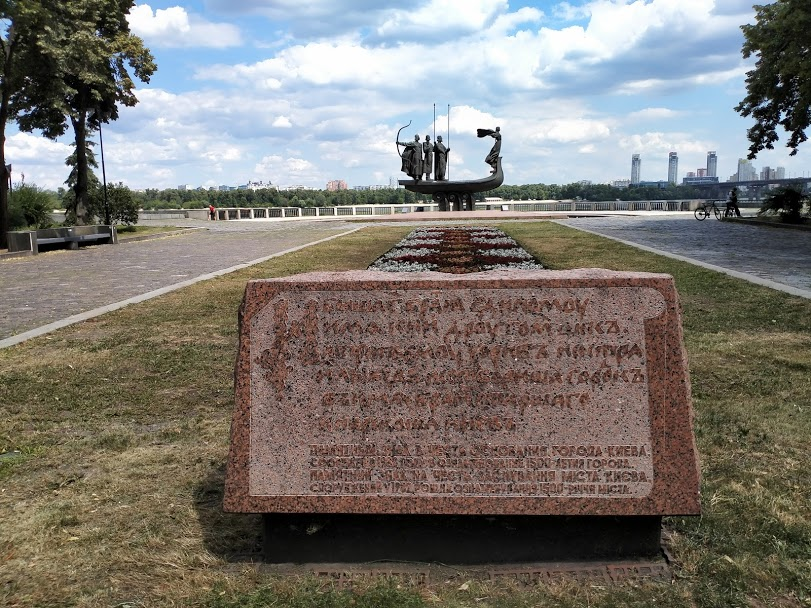
With its commemoration marker
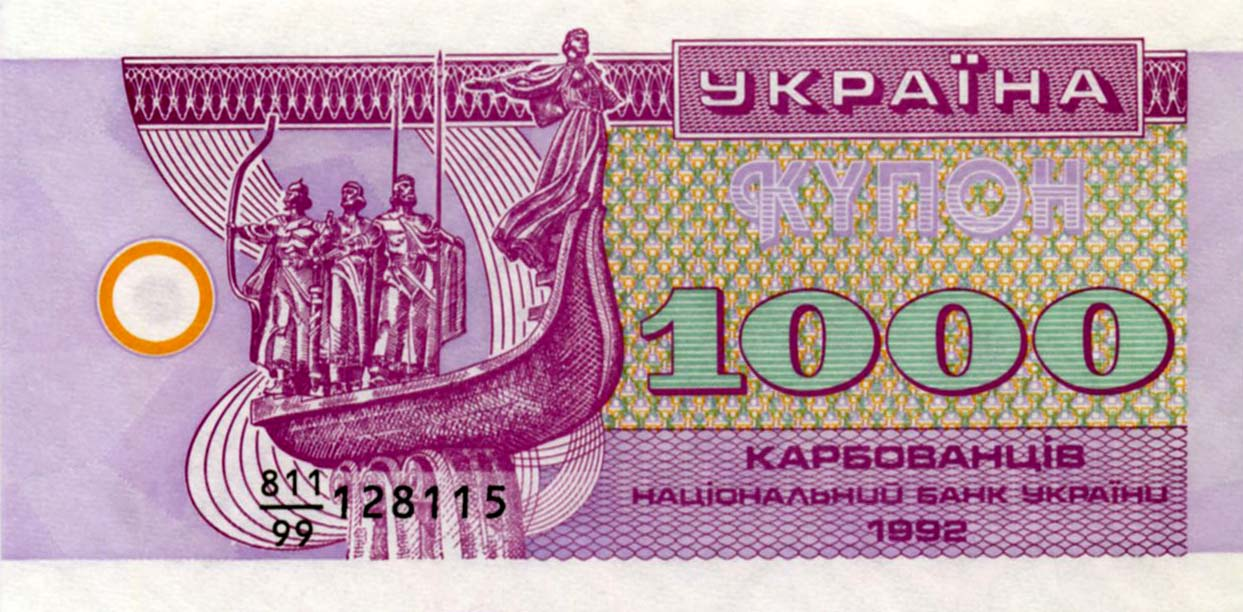
Ukrainian 1000-karbovanets note from 1992, depicting the monument on its obverse

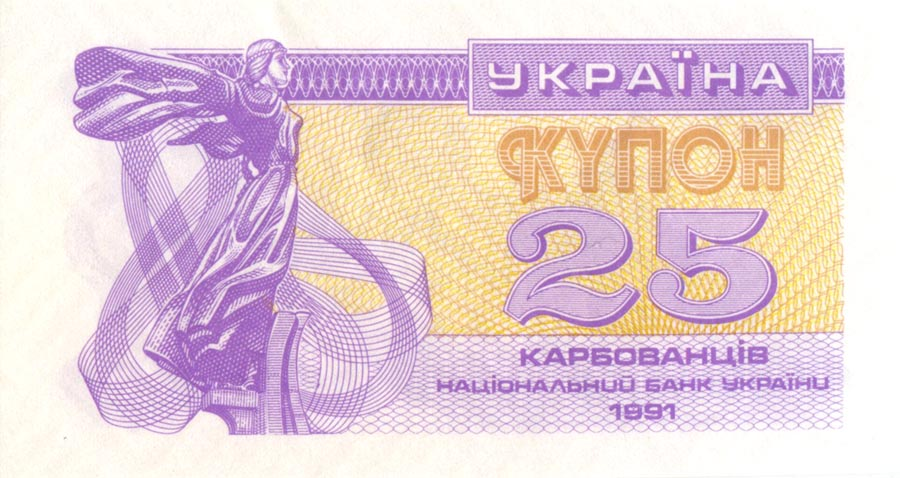
Ukrainian 25-karbovanets note from 1991, depicting Lybid from the monument on its obverse

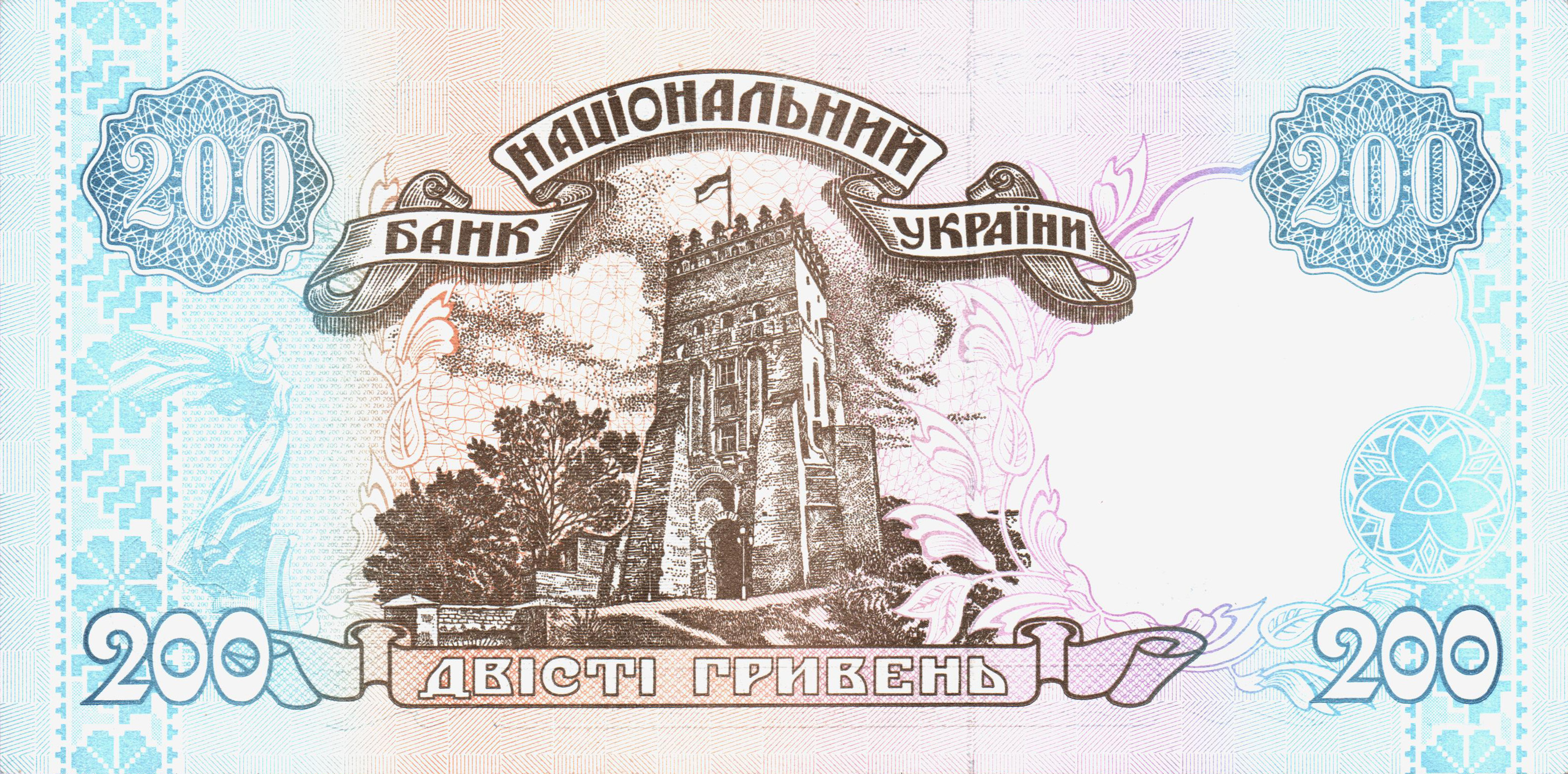
Ukrainian 200-hryvnia note from 2001, depicting Lybid from the monument (faintly in blue) on the left side of its reverse

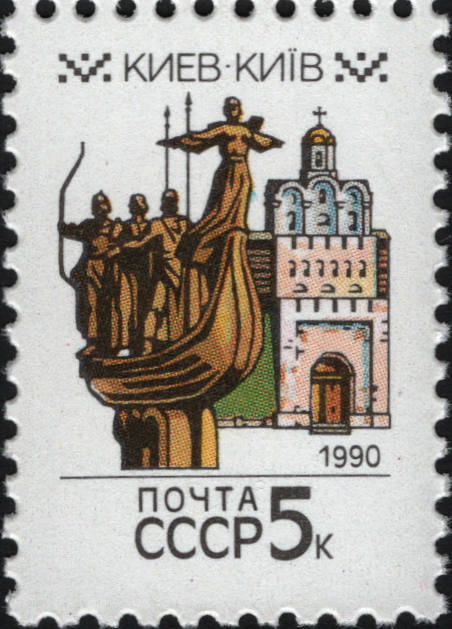
Soviet postage stamp from 1990, depicting the monument alongside Kyiv's Golden Gate (Note: The two landmarks are not actually next to each other in Kyiv.)

== See also ==
- Monument to the founders of Odesa
