= Anna K =

Anna K may refer to:

- Anna K (designer) (born 1995), Ukrainian fashion designer
- Anna K (singer) (born 1965), Czech singer
- Anna K. or Anna Kjellberg, bassist for Drain STH and Revolting Cocks
