= Lybid =

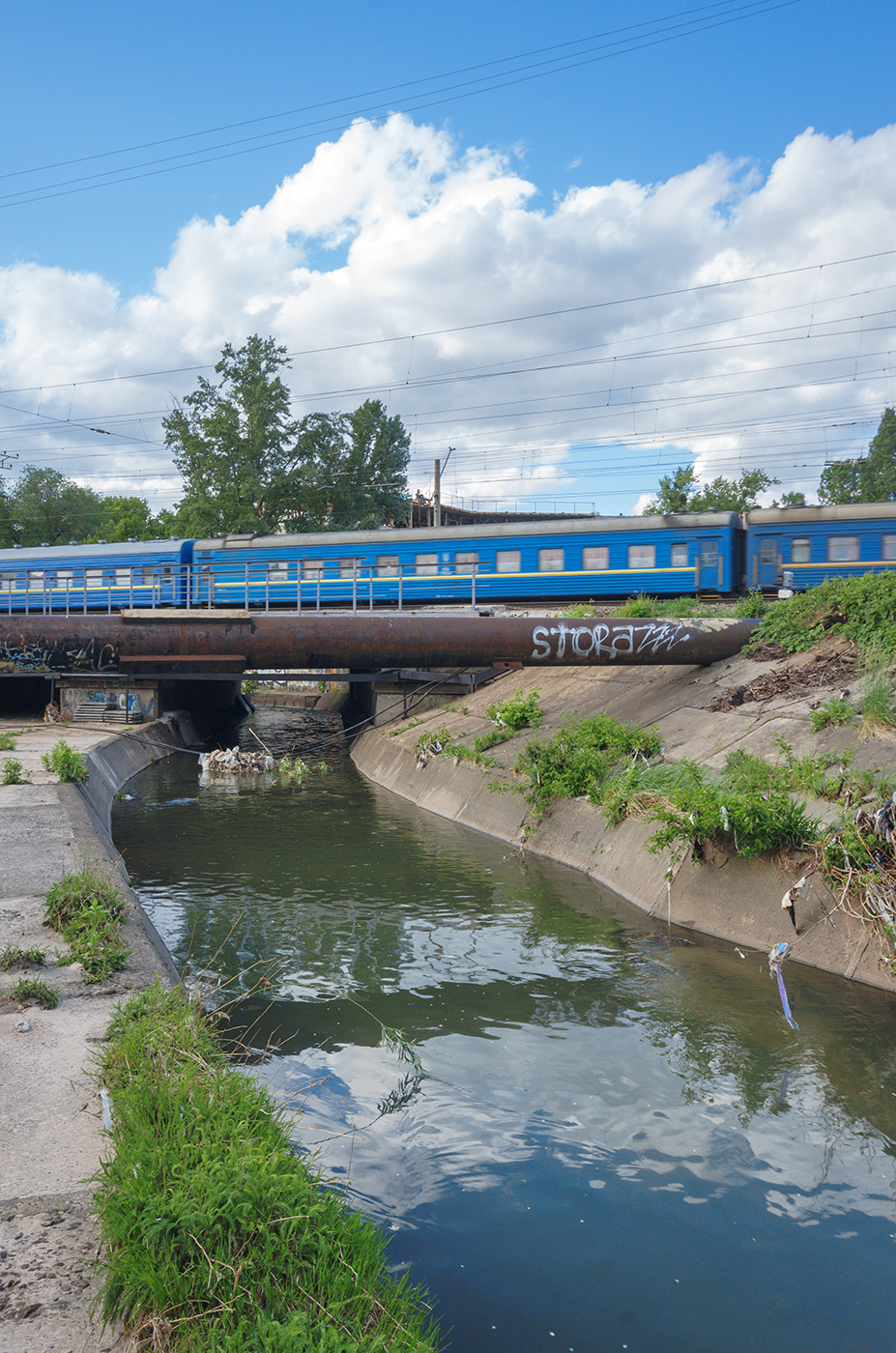

Location
- Country: Ukraine

Physical characteristics
- Mouth: Dnieper
  - location: Kyiv
  - coordinates: 50.379°N 30.5809°E
- Length: 16 km (9.9 mi)
- Basin size: 68 km^{2} (26 sq mi)

Basin features
- Progression: Dnieper→ Dnieper–Bug estuary→ Black Sea

The Lybid (Ukrainian: Либідь) is a small river in Kyiv, Ukraine. A right tributary of the Dnieper, it flows within the "Right Bank" (original) part of the city, just to the west of the historic center. The Lybid has played an important role in shaping Kyiv's urban design by aiding the city's drainage system.

== Course ==
The Lybid runs east, then southeast, then roughly parallel to the Dnieper before it takes a sharp eastward turn and enters the Dnieper several kilometers south of Kyiv's center. The river travels through a culvert for much of its course. It can be seen along the railway lines south-east from the main station of Kyiv.

The Lybid has a number of small tributaries, most notably the Khreschatyk River. It runs parallel to modern Kyiv's main street, Khreschatyk. Another notable tributary, with small lakes on its course, joins just as the Lybid turns to the east in the Montajnik area south of central Kyiv.

== Name ==
The river was named after the possibly mythical Lybid, sister of the legendary founders of Kyiv, Kyi, Shchek and Khoryv. Others state that Lybid was a former ruler of the Kyiv prior to times of Kyivan Rus'.

== History ==
References to the Lybid River were first made in records in 968 A.D. The Lybid was then a relatively big river, as deep as 20 meters in some places. It formed the southern boundary of the city.

In the 19th century, the river was widely used for milling. In some places, it reached up to 50 meters across. Three watermills were situated on one of these wide sections where the river formed a reservoir with small islands on it. The biggest watermill was Mikhaylivska. Seven watermills lined the river. Due to the milling business, the surrounding area began to develop, with inns and small villages. Late in the 19th century, construction of the railway began.

== Twenty-first century ==
Lybid is no more than half a meter deep and does not exceed four meters in width. Its course now is mostly subterranean, flowing through concrete pipes, growing polluted as it flows past the town's industrial areas.
