= Kyi, Shchek and Khoryv =

Legendary founders of Kyiv

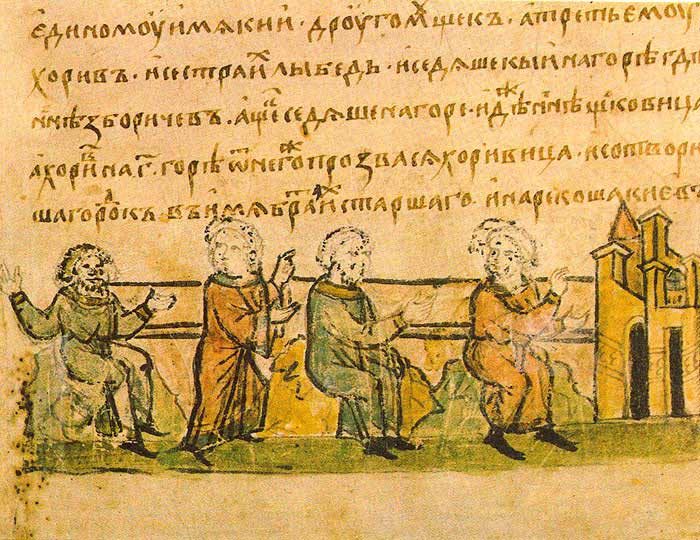
Kyi, Shchek and Khoryv with Lybed' (miniature of the Radziwiłł Chronicle)

Kyi, Shchek and Khoryv (Note: Old East Slavic: Кии, Щекъ, Хоривъ, romanized: Kii, Ščekǔ, Chorivǔ; Ukrainian: Кий, Щек, Хорив, romanized: Kyj, Šček, Choryv; Russian: Кий, Щек, Хоривъ, romanized: Kij, Šček, Choriv) were the three legendary brothers—often mentioned along with their sister Lybеd' (Note: (Old East Slavic: Лыбѣдь, romanized: Lybed'; Ukrainian: Либідь, romanized: Lybid'; Russian: Лыбедь, romanized: Lybed')) —who, according to the Primary Chronicle, founded the city of Kiev (modern Kyiv), which eventually became the capital of Kievan Rus', and is the present-day capital of Ukraine.

There is no precise and historically established information about the existence of the four legendary siblings and the establishment of the city of Kiev. It has been claimed by some scholars that Kyi was also a prince (knyaz) and founded the so-called Kyi dynasty, from the Slavic tribe of Polans.

== Historical background ==
In the Primary Chronicle (c. 1110s), written by a monk of the Kyiv Pechersk Lavra (traditionally attributed to Nestor), a special place is held by the legend of the foundation of Kiev by three brothers. Nestor places those brothers onto various hills of Kyiv. Geographically, the Old Town is located on a higher right bank of the Dnieper, which is an extension of the Dnieper Upland, where remnants of the Church of the Tithes are located.

The Chronicle further states that there were people ("who did not know what they were saying") who considered Kyi a mere ferryman. But it later claims that Kyi, as a prince of his gens, was visiting Czargrad and received great honors from the Emperor. Dmitry Likhachov combined attestations of the Nikon Chronicle, which also recounts that Kyi with a great army marched onto Czargrad and received great honors from the Emperor. During his expedition to Constantinople, Kyi also founded a city of Kyivets on the Danube.

Nestor also names the approximate date of the assault on Kyiv by the Khazar Empire as "after the death of Kyi," which supports Boris Rybakov's hypothesis of the 6th–7th centuries. In his chronicle Nestor does not indicate the date of Kyi's death nor the existence or absence of heirs who continued to rule after his death. The chronicle does mention a meeting between local residents with the newly arrived Askold and Dir who asked them whose city Kjiv was, and received the answer that the three brothers who built it were long dead and the residents now paid tribute to the Khazars. However, the Polish historian Jan Długosz points out the Przemysł Chronicle that asserts, "after the death of Kyi, Shchek and Khoryv, their children and grandchildren who descended from them by direct lineage ruled for many years."

== Text of the Primary Chronicle ==
The text of the legendary founding of Kiev (Kyiv) by the three brothers and their sister is found in the Primary Chronicle on page 9, lines 5–21. Each full sentence has been highlighted in the comparison below:

=== Legendary founding of Kyiv/Kiev ===
Line	Laurentian Codex	Hypatian Codex	Samuel Hazzard Cross & Olgerd P. Sherbowitz-Wetzor English translation of the Laurentian text (2013) [1930, 1953]
9.5	полемъ же жившемъ ѡсобѣ и володѣ ющемъ	полѧномъ же живущиим ѡсобѣ и владѣющимъ	While the Polyanians lived apart and governed
9.6	и роды своими. иже и до сее братьѣ бѧху	роды своим. ꙗже и до сеꙗ братѧ бѧху	their families (for before the time of these brothers there were already
9.7	полѧне. и живѧху кождо съ своимъ родомъ. и	полѧне. и живѧху кождо съ родом своимъ.	Polyanians, and each one lived with his gens
9.8	на своихъ мѣстѣхъ. владѣюще кождо родомъ	на своихъ мѣстехъ. володѣюще кождо родомъ	on his own lands, ruling over his kinsfolk),
9.9	своимъ на своихъ мѣстѣх. быша .г҃. братьꙗ.	своимъ·:· И быша .г҃. брата.	there were three brothers,
9.10	единому имѧ кии. а другому щекъ. а третьему	аединому имѧ кии. а другому щекъ. а третьему	Kyi, Shchek, and
9.11	хорвиъ] сестра ихъ лыбедь. сѣдѧще	хоривъ. и сестра ихъ лыб<ѣ>дь. и сѣдѧше	Khoriv, and their sister was named Lybed'. Kyi
9.12	кии на горѣ гдѣ же <ны> не оувозъ боричевъ.	кии на горѣ кдѣ нн҃ѣ оувозъ боричевъ.	lived upon the hill where the Borichev trail now is,
9.13	а щекъ сѣдѧше на горѣ. гдѣ ныне зоветсѧ	а щекъ сѣдѧше на горѣ. кдѣ ннѣ зоветсѧ	and Shchek dwelt upon the hill now named
9.14	щековица. а хоривъ на третьеи горѣ.	щековица. а хоривъ на третьеи горѣ.	Shchekovitsa, while on the third resided Khoriv,
9.15	ѿ него же прозвасѧ хоревица. и створиша	ѿ нюдѹ же прозвасѧ хорівица. створиша	after whom this hill is named Khorevitsa. They built
9.16	градъ во имѧ брата своего старѣишаго. и нарекоша	городокъ. во имѧ брата ихъ старѣишаго. и наркоша	a town and named it [...] after their oldest brother [and named
9.17	имѧ ему киевъ. бѧше ѡколо	и киевъ. и бѧше ѡколо	it Kyiv]. Around the
9.18	града сѣсъ и боръ великъ. и бѧху ловѧща	города лѣсъ и боръ великъ. и бѧху ловѧще	town lay a wood and a great pine-forest in which they used to catch
9.19	звѣрь бѧху мужи мудри и смыслени	звѣрь. бѧхуть бо мудрѣ и смыслени. и	wild beasts. These men were wise and prudent;
9.20	нарицахусѧ полѧне. ѿ ни<хже> есть полѧне	нари[ци]хусѧ полѧне. ѿ нихъ же суть полѧне.	they were called Polyanians, and there are Polyanians descended from them living
9.21	в киевѣ и до сего д҃не.	киꙗне и до сего д҃ни.	in Kyiv to this day.

=== Acts of Kyi ===
In the subsequent lines 9.22–10.14, the background, life story and legacy of Kyi and his siblings is briefly lined out. Lines 10:5 and 10:6 contain well-known examples of disputed textual variants in the Primary Chronicle: the main textual witnesses including the Laurentian and Hypatian Codices have different texts here, and scholars cannot agree which manuscript most closely reflects the original text.

Line	Laurentian Codex	Hypatian Codex	Samuel Hazzard Cross & Olgerd P. Sherbowitz-Wetzor English translation of the Laurentian text (2013) [1930, 1953]
9.22	Ини же не свѣдуще рекоша. ꙗко кии	инии же не вѣдуще ркоша. ꙗко кии	Some ignorant persons have claimed that Kyi
9.23	есть перевозникъ былъ. оу кіева бо бѧше перевозъ	есть перевозникъ быс. оу киева бо перевозъ бѧше	was a ferryman, for near Kyiv there was a ferry
10.1	тогда с оноꙗ стороны днѣ[пра]. тѣмь	тогда съ ѡноꙗ страны днепра. тѣмь	at that time from the other side of the Dŭněprŭ, therefore
10.2	гл҃ху на перевозъ на киевъ. аще бо бы	гл҃аху на перевозъ на киевъ. аще бо былъ	[people] used to say: "To Kyi's ferry." Now if
10.3	перевозникъ кии. то не бы ходилъ цр҃югороду	перевозникъ кыи. то не бы ходилъ къ црсюград.	Kyi had been a mere ferryman, he would never have gone to Tsargrad.
10.4	но се кии кнѧжаше в родѣ своемь.	но сии кии кнѧжаше в роду своем. и	He was then the chief of his kin, and
10.5	приходившю ему ко цр҃ю. ꙗкоже сказають.	приходившю ему къ с црсю не свѣмы. но токмо ѡ семъ вѣмы ꙗкоже сказають	Laurentian: [when he came to the tsar, as they say,] Hypatian: '[precisely] when he came to the tsar', we cannot determine, but one thing/this we do know, as they say'
10.6	ꙗко велику честь приꙗлъ ѿ цр҃ѧ. при	ꙗко велику честь приꙗлъ есть ѿ црсѧ. которого не вѣмъ. и при	Laurentian: 'what great honor he received from the [tsar]' Hypatian: 'that he received great honor from the tsar' whom we do not know and
10.7	[ко]торомь приходивъ цр҃и. идущю же ему ѡпѧть.	котором приходи црси. идущю жеему ѡпѧть.	in whose [reign] he came to the tsar. On his homeward journey,
10.8	приде къ дунаеви. възлюби мѣсто и сруби	приде къ дунаеви. и възлюби мѣсто. и сруби	he arrived at the Danube. The place pleased him and he built
10.9	градокъ малъ хотѧше сѣсти с родомъ	городокъ малъ. и хотѧше сѣсти с родомъ	a small town, wishing to dwell there with his
10.10	а [с]воимъ и не даша ему ту [блі] зь живущии. еже и	своимъ. и не даша ему близъ живущии. еже и	kinsfolk. But those who lived near by would not grant him this [privilege]. Yet even now
10.11	донынѣ наречють дуиц[и городі] ще киевець.	доннѣ нарѣчють дунаици. городі ще киевѣць.	the dwellers by the Danube call this town Kyivets.
10.12	киеви же пришедшю въ свои гр[адъ киев]ъ.	киеви же прішедшю въ свои городъ киевъ.	When Kyi returned to Kyiv, his native city,
10.13	ту животъ свои сконча. а братъ его ще[къ]	ту и скон[ч]а животъ свои. и брата его щекъ	he ended his life there; and his brothers Shchek
10.14	[и хорі] въ и сестра их лыбедь ту скончашсаѧ.	и хоривъ. и сестра ихъ лы бѣдь ту скон[ч]ашасѧ·:·	and Khoriv, as well as their sister Lybed', died there also.

=== Legacy of the four siblings ===
The Primary Chronicle relates three different versions of what happened to political power amongst the Polyanians in the period after the four siblings (the three brothers and their sister) died and before the Khazars vassalised them. Lines 10.15–10.17 suggest that the offspring of Kyi, Shchek, Khoryv and Lybid' continued to reign amongst the Polyanians, while the Derevlians and other tribes around them had their own knyazi (princes):

Line	Laurentian Codex	Hypatian Codex	Samuel Hazzard Cross & Olgerd P. Sherbowitz-Wetzor English translation of the Laurentian text (2013) [1930, 1953]
10.15	[и по с]ихъ бр[атьи] держати. почаша родъ	И по сеи братьи почаша дѣржати родъ	After the deaths of these three brothers, their gens
10.16	ихъ кнѧженье в полѧх[ъ]. в деревлѧхъ	ихъ кнѧжение в полѧхъ. а въ деревлѧхъ	assumed the supremacy among the Polyanians. The Derevlians
10.17	свое. а дреговичи свое.	свое. а дрьгови[ч]и свое.	[had a principality] of their own, as did also the Dregovichians,... (Note: The Cross & Sherbowitz-Wetzor translation is quite free and eloquent in lines 10.15–19 ('their gens assumed the supremacy among the Polyanians. The Derevlians possessed a principality of their own, as did also the Dregovichians, while the Slavs had their own authority in Novgorod, and another principality existed on the Polota, where the Polotians dwell.'), while the original Slavonic text reads like a formal, concise summation ('their clan began to reign (къняжение) among [the] Polyanians, and [the] Derevlians among their own [people], and [the] Dregovichians among their own [people], and [the] Slověne among their own [people] in Nověgorodě, and [the] other on [the] Polotě, which [were the] Polochane.').)

16.21–17.3 say that upon the deaths of the four siblings, the Derevlians seized power and "oppressed" the Polyanians, then "other neighbours", and then finally the Khazars made them tributaries:

Line	Laurentian Codex	Hypatian Codex	Samuel Hazzard Cross & Olgerd P. Sherbowitz-Wetzor English translation of the Laurentian text (2013) [1930, 1953]
16.21	По сихъ же лѣтѣхъ по см҃рти братьѣ сеꙗ	По сихъ же лѣтехъ по см҃рти братьꙗ сеꙗ.	After these years, and after the three brothers' deaths, the [Polyanians] (Note: In 16.21, Cross & Sherbowitz-Wetzor added the words "in Kyiv", and instead of "these" (сеꙗ, seya) wrote "the Polyanians", in order to provide context and help the reader understand which three brothers are meant, and that the subject of the sentence are the Polyanians (last mentioned in line 13.8).)
16.22	бы[ша ѡ]бидимы древлѧми. инѣми ѡколними.	быша ѡбидими деревлѧны. и инѣми ѡколными.	were oppressed by the Derevlians and other neighbors of theirs.
17.1	и наидоща ꙗ козарѣ сѣдѧщаꙗ на горах	и наидоша ꙗ козаре сѣдѧщаꙗ в лѣсѣхъ	Then the Khazars came upon them as they lived in the hills (Note: The Hypatian Codex is the only main textual witness to write в лѣсѣхъ на х горах, "in the forests on the hills/mountains"; all other witnesses say на горах [сихъ] в лѣсѣхъ, "on [these] hills/mountains in the forests".)
17.2	сихъ в лѣсѣхъ и рѣша козари. платит[е] намъ	на х горах. и ркоша козарѣ. платите намъ	and forests, and the Khazars said: "Pay us (Note: The entire Primary Chronicle is written in direct speech, whether it presents dialogues between people or when a prince sends out envoys with a messenge to another prince. In 17.2–3, Cross & Sherbowitz-Wetzor freely translated и рѣша козари. платит[е] намъ. as 'and demanded tribute from them.', but a more literal translation would be 'and the Khazars said: "Pay us tribute".')
17.3	дань.	дань.	tribute."

In lines 20.24–21.3, the inhabitants of Kyiv/Kiev tell Askold and Dir a brief history of the city, which does not mention either a reign of the siblings' descendants, nor of an "oppression" by the Derevlians or other neighbouring tribes; instead, the three brothers' deaths are immediately followed by paying tribute to the Khazars:

Line	Laurentian Codex	Hypatian Codex	Samuel Hazzard Cross & Olgerd P. Sherbowitz-Wetzor English translation of the Laurentian text (2013) [1930, 1953]
20.24	чии се градокъ. ѡни же рѣша была сутъ	чии се городъ. ѡни же ркоша была сут.	[Askold and Dir:] 'Whose city is this?' And they said: 'Once [upon a time], there were
21.1	.г҃. братьꙗ. кии. щекъ. хоривъ. иже сдѣлаша	три братьꙗ. кии. щекъ. хоривъ. иже сдѣлаша	three brothers, Kyi, Shchek and Khoriv, who built
21.2	градоко сь. и изгибоша и мы сѣдимъ. платѧче	гроодъ сии. и изъгыбоша. а мы сѣдимъ [въ го]род[ы] ихъ. и платимы	this city. They died, and we[, their descendants,] are living here, (Note: Only the Hypatian Codex writes а мы сѣдимъ [въ го]род[ы] ихъ, which could be read as "and we live [here] in their city" or as "and we, their clan/descendants, live [here]". Only the Khlebnikov Codex writes а мы сѣдим д рѡд их, "and we, their clan/descendants, live [here]". The other manuscripts including the Laurentian Codex omit these words and only read и мы сѣдимъ, "and we sit (down) / dwell / live [here]". Shakhmatov and Ostrowski regarded the lectio brevior as the original, while Cross & Sherbowitz-Wetzor, Likhachev, and Thuis all included "their descendants" in their translations.) and paying
21.3	дань родомъ их козаромъ. (Note: Only the Lauretian Codex and Trinity Chronicle (now lost) wrote родомъ их[ъ] козаромъ, "to their clan [the] Khazars", suggesting that Kyi, Shchek and Khoryv were themselves Khazars. Only Bychkov 1872 accepted this reading. The Hypatian and Khlebnikov manuscripts had the words [въ го]род[ы] ихъ or д рѡд их in line 21.2 (suggesting that the inhabitants of Kyiv / the Polyanians were descended from the founding siblings rather than that the siblings were descended from the Khazars), but the Radziwiłł Chronicle and Academic Chronicle feature these words in neither place. Therefore, is impossible to say for certain whether these words were present in the original text (and if so, where); or whether they were only inserted later by copyists, but in different places; Ostrowski & Birnbaum concluded the latter.)	дань козаром.	tribute to the Khazars.'

== Historiographical interpretation ==
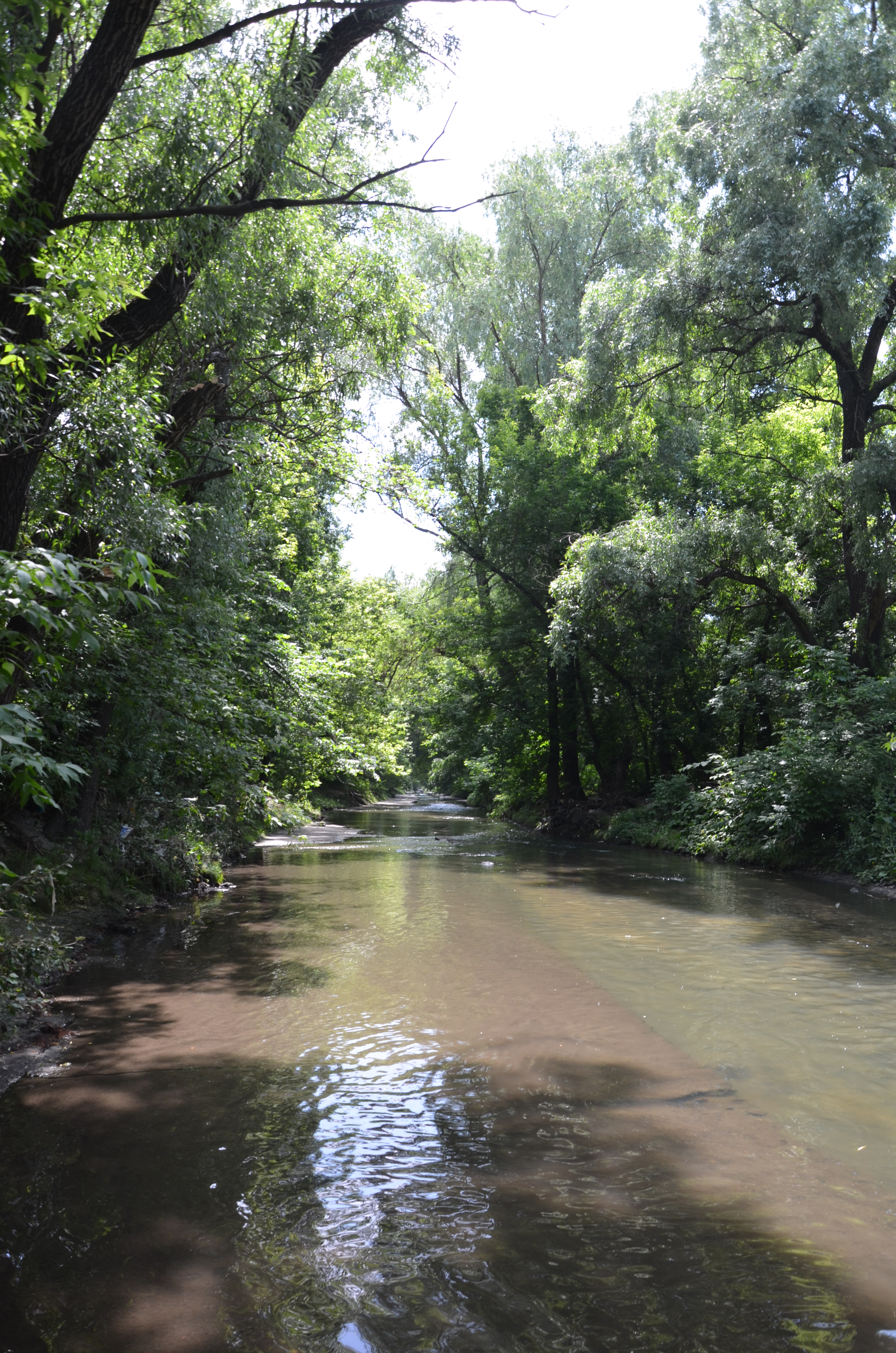
The river Lybid, just south of Kyiv, may have inspired the name "Lybid" for the woman who co-founded Kyiv.

Many 20th-century Soviet historians considered Kyi and his rule circa the 6th century to be actual history. Among such historians were Boris Rybakov, Dmitry Likhachov, Aleksey Shakhmatov, Alexander Presnyakov, Petro Tolochko, and Nataliia Polonska-Vasylenko. In 2006, Serhii Plokhy still took the idea seriously, but he no longer mentioned Kyi and his siblings in his 2017 book The Gates of Europe: A History of Ukraine, relegating them to the realm of legend, as little reliable information is known about Slavs in Ukraine prior to the 10th century. Roman Adrian Cybriwsky (2016) said "the founding story of Kyiv is dubious", and called Kyi "a person who may or may not have actually existed."

The names of Kyi and his brothers have equivalents in an Armenian chronicle from the 7th century, History of Taron, by Zenob Glak. In it, Kyi and Khoryv have counterparts in brothers Kouar and Horian, while Polyans is paralleled in the Balounik district. An explanation for this can be found both in the common source (probably Scythian) of Ukrainian and Armenian legends, and in the common mythological plot used to explain the founding of the many cows that inhabit the city. The legend also has parallels in the Croatian origo gentis of five brothers and two sisters (Kloukas, Lobelos, Kosentzis, Mouchlo, Chrobatos, Touga and Bouga) from the 30th chapter of De Administrando Imperio by Constantine VII (10th century), and the Bulgarian apocryphal chronicle (12th century) about the ethnogenesis of the Bulgarians. All three speak about people who migrated to a foreign land, whose leader was of the same name (Kyi in Kyiv, Chrobatos in Croats, and Slav in Bulgarians), while Kyivan and Croatian mention a sister. The female personality and number three can be found also in three daughters (youngest Libuše) of Duke Krok from Chronica Boemorum (12 century), two sons and daughter (Krakus II, Lech II, and Princess Wanda) of Krakus legendary founder of Kraków from Chronica seu originale regum et principum Poloniae (12–13th century), and three brothers Lech, Czech, and Rus from Wielkopolska Chronicle (13th century).

Khoryv or Horiv, and his oronym Khorevytsia, some scholars related to the Croatian ethnonym of White Croats. Paščenko related his name, beside to the Croatian ethnonym, also to the solar deity Khors. Near Kyiv there is a stream where previously existed a large village named Horvatka or Hrovatka (it was destroyed in the time of Joseph Stalin), which flows into Stuhna River.

Lybid (Ukrainian: Либідь) is the name of another tributary of the Dnipro, just south of Kyiv. As a river, Lybed' (Church Slavonic: Лыбедь) is mentioned twice in the Primary Chronicle, first on page 69.8 during the Pecheneg Siege of Kiev (968), and second on page 79.28–80.1 as the place where Vladimir the Great settled his wife Rogned' sub anno 980. In both cases, it takes the form of на Лыбеди (na Lybedi, "at/on the Lybed'"). It is unknown whether the sister was named after the river or vice versa.

Byzantine sources report that the prince Kyi (originally Kuver) was brought up at the court of Emperor Justinian I in his youth, converted to Christianity in Constantinople, and was educated there.

According to other Byzantine testimonies, Kyi was a contemporary of Emperor Heraclius (575–641). As his contemporary John of Nicaea writes in detail, "by the power of the Holy and Life-Giving Baptism he received, he defeated all barbarians and pagans." The friendly ties of the ancient prince with the Byzantine imperial court is evidenced by the "Primary Chronicle".

== Archaeological excavations ==
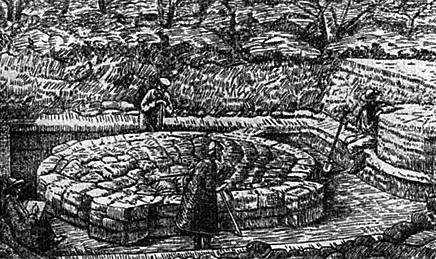
Graphic depiction of archaeological excavations in Kyiv by Vikentiy Khvoyka

Archaeological excavations have shown that there was indeed an ancient settlement starting with the 6th century. Some speculate that Kyi was a real person, a knyaz (prince) from the tribe of the Polans. According to legend, Kyi, the eldest brother, was a Polianian Prince, and the city was named after him.

In the sixth to seventh centuries, the borders of three cultural groups of monuments converged on the Polans land — Kyiv Oblast — Prague, Penkiv and Kolochyn cultures, and in the eighth to tenth centuries — Luka-Raikovetska and Volyntsevo culture. From the very beginning, Kyiv was the center of not one, but several tribal groups.

== Modern tributes ==
In addition to the respective hills and the river, there are Shchekavytska and Khoryva Streets in Kyiv's ancient neighborhood of Podil.

In 1982, Kyi, Shchek, Khoryv and Lybid were depicted (standing on an ancient riverboat) in a sculpture, called the Monument to the Founders of Kyiv by Vasyl Borodai, at the river-side of Navodnytsky Park. At the time of its unveiling, the Soviet authorities claimed that it was simultaneously on the occasion of the 60th anniversary of the formation of the USSR, as well as the alleged "1500th anniversary" of the foundation of Kyiv in 482. Various scholars and commentators found "482" an odd attribution, as no such date is mentioned in the Primary Chronicle; historian Taras Kuzio said that 'the year 482 had no special significance'. There was speculation that the two anniversaries were merged for the sake of convenience by the Soviet regime, to emphasise the common origins of Ukraine and Russia, and step around their many conflicts. Nevertheless, several politicians would go on to embrace 482 as the date of the legendary foundation, including former Kyivan mayor Oleksandr Omelchenko, who utilised it in order to argue the Ukrainian capital was much older than Moscow. The monument soon became iconic for the city and has been used as Kyiv's unofficial emblem. In 2001, another statue was installed at a fountain of the Maidan Nezalezhnosti.

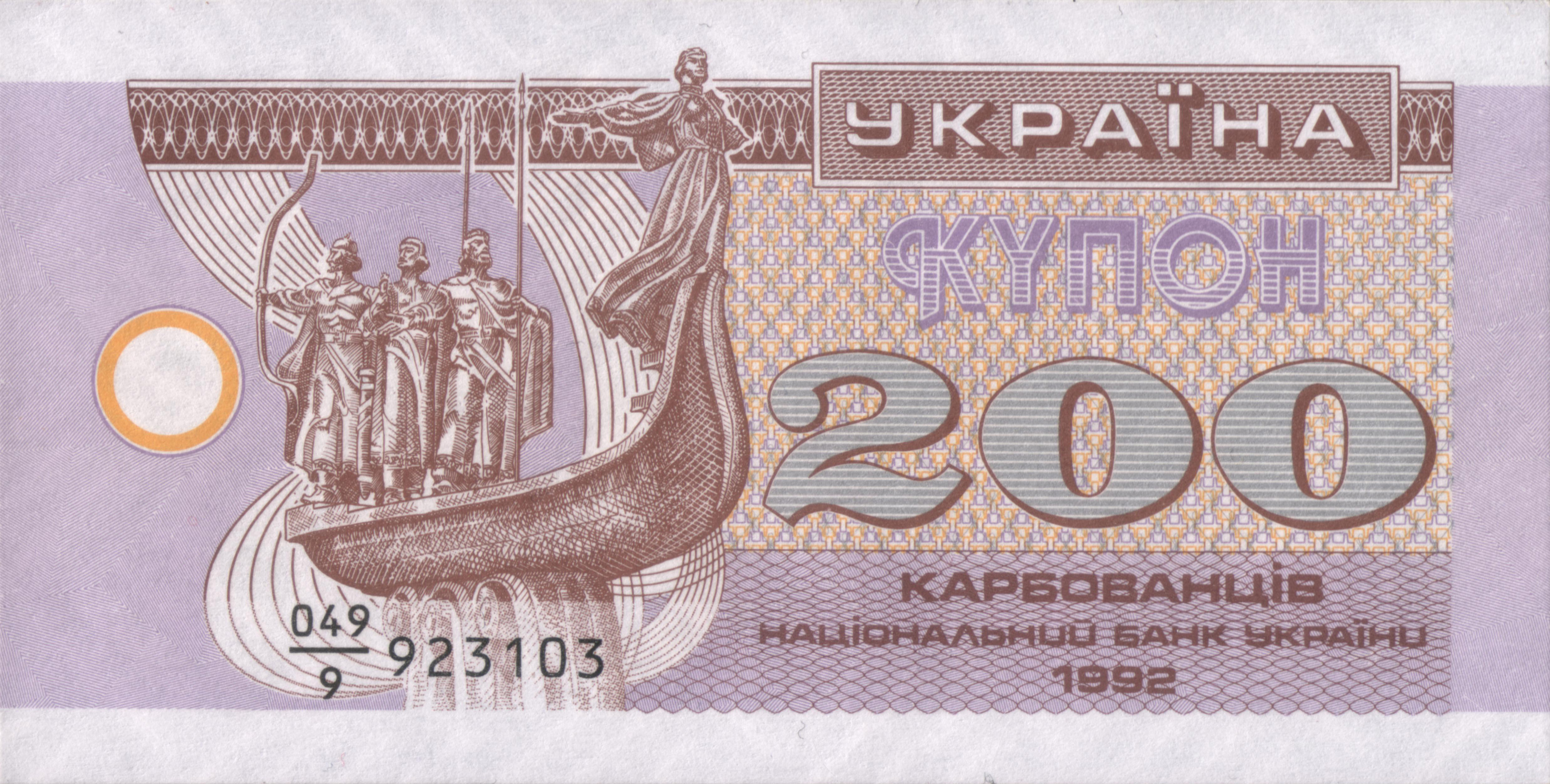
The sculpture of Kyiv's founders depicted on Ukraine's interim bank note in 1990s

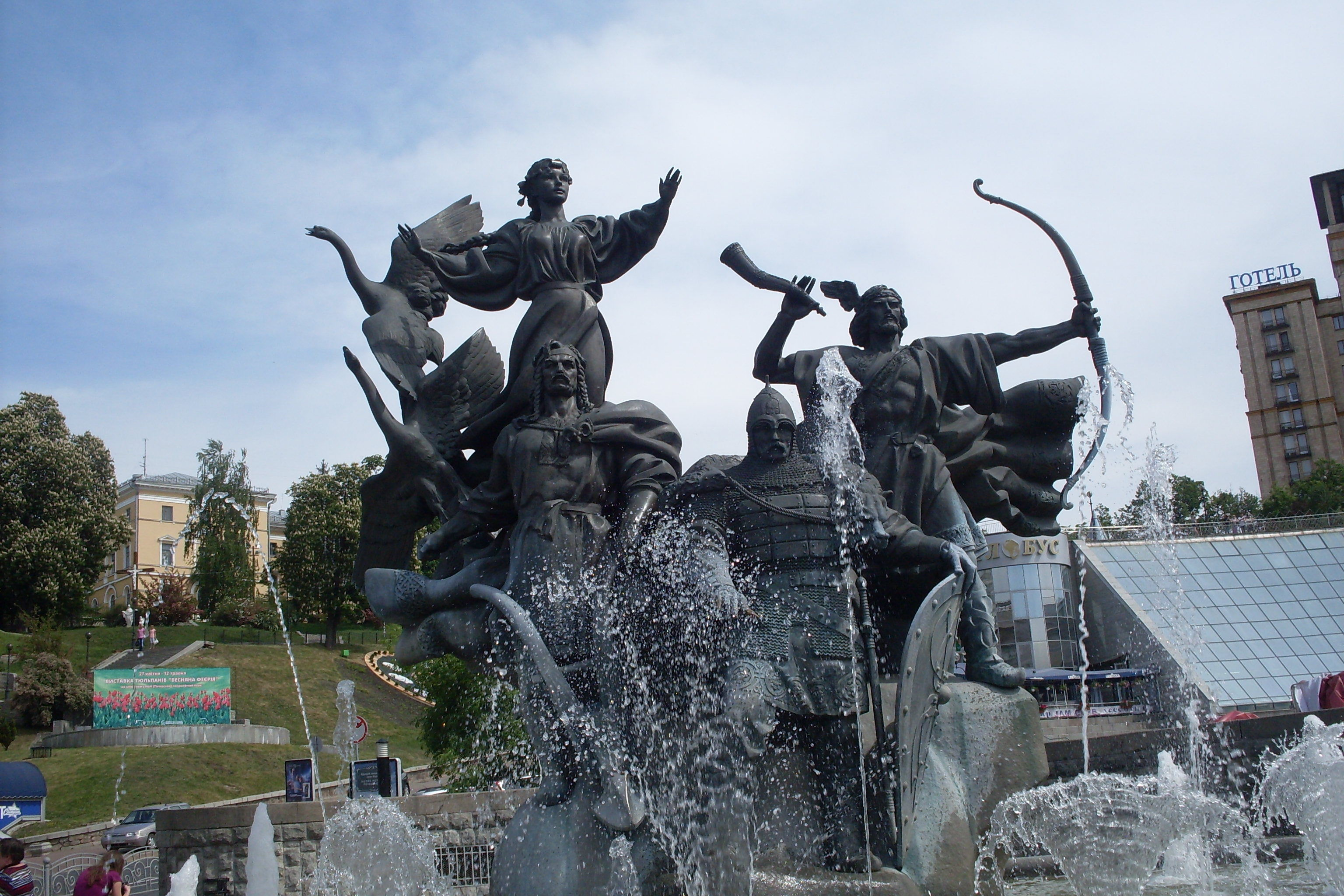
Maidan Nezalezhnosti Monument to the Founders of Kyiv (2001)

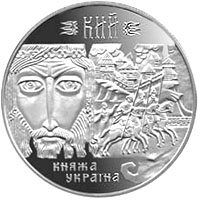
Commemorative coin "Kyi" denomination of 10 hryvnias is dedicated to Knyaz Kyi, 1998

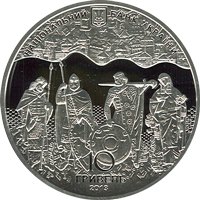
Kyi, Shchek and Khoryv and Lybid' on the obverse of the NBU silver coin "900 years of the Primary Chronicle", 2013

== In popular culture ==
- In a 2019 episode of the satirical comedy series Servant of the People, Ukraine is in a political crisis, with several regions threatening to break away. Prime Minister Yuriy Ivanovich Chuiko (played by Stanislav Boklan) recommends President Vasily Petrovych Holoborodko (played by Volodymyr Zelenskyy) to hold an empassioned speech, referring to the common origins of all Ukrainians from when the capital was founded by Kyi, Shchek and Khoryv and their sister Lybid', to inspire everyone to reunite the country. Yuriy warns the President to correctly remember and pronounce the legendary founders' names, but then goes on to mix them up himself on live television, causing a huge political scandal.

== See also ==
- Lech, Czech, and Rus
- Jonakr's sons

== Bibliography ==
=== Primary sources ===
- Cross, Samuel Hazzard; Sherbowitz-Wetzor, Olgerd P. (1953). The Russian Primary Chronicle, Laurentian Text. Translated and edited by Samuel Hazzard Cross and Olgerd P. Sherbowitz-Wetzor (PDF). Cambridge, Massachusetts: The Mediaeval Academy of America. p. 325. (First edition published in 1930. The first 50 pages are a scholarly introduction.)
  - Cross, Samuel Hazzard; Sherbowitz-Wetzor, Olgerd P. (2013) [1953]. SLA 218. Ukrainian Literature and Culture. Excerpts from The Rus' Primary Chronicle (Povest vremennykh let, PVL) (PDF). Toronto: Electronic Library of Ukrainian Literature, University of Toronto. p. 16. Archived from the original (PDF) on 30 May 2014.
- Ostrowski, Donald; Birnbaum, David J. (7 December 2014). "Rus' primary chronicle critical edition – Interlinear line-level collation". pvl.obdurodon.org (in Church Slavic). Archived from the original on 28 April 2025. – A 2014 improved digitised version of the 2002/2003 Ostrowski et al. edition.
- Thuis, Hans (2015). Nestorkroniek. De oudste geschiedenis van het Kievse Rijk [Nestor Chronicle: the oldest history of the Kievan Realm] (in Dutch). Nijmegen: Uitgeverij Vantilt. p. 304. ISBN 9789460042287.

=== Literature ===
- Gunnarsson, Valur (7 January 2021). Origin Stories: The Kyivan Rus in Ukrainian Historiography. Skemman (Thesis).
- Ostrowski, Donald (2007). "The Načal'Nyj Svod Theory and the Povest Vremennyx Let". Russian Linguistics. 31 (3). Springer: 269–308. doi:10.1007/s11185-007-9014-z. ISSN 0304-3487. JSTOR 40221289.
