= Inna Kolomiets =

Ukrainian sculptor

Inna Antonivna Kolomiets (8 March 1921 – 1 August 2005) was an outstanding Ukrainian sculptor, Honored Artist of Ukraine (1973), and a member of the National Union of Artists of Ukraine (1973). The creative work of Inna Kolomiets is an example of authentic national art of the twentieth century. Since the 1950s, she had a subtle influence on the vector of development of Ukrainian social realism.

== Early life and education ==
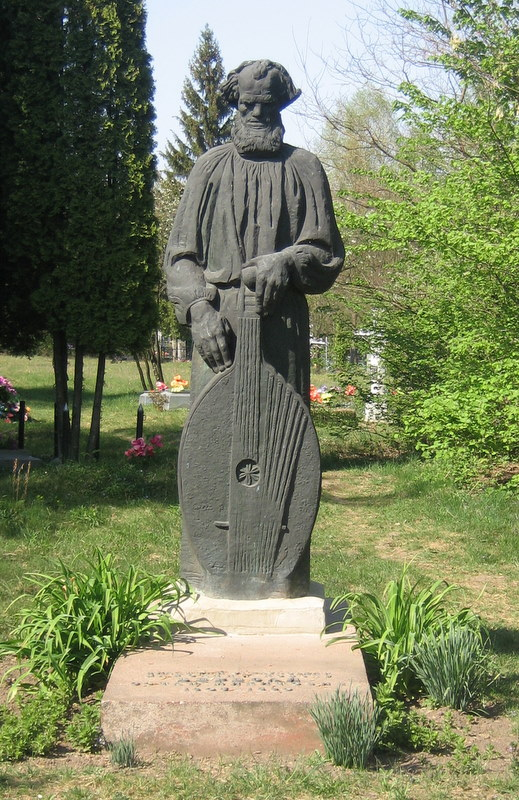
Ostap Veresai Grave by Inna Kolomiets

As a child, Inna Kolomiets' worldview was greatly influenced by the teachers she studied with such as Honored Artists of Ukraine Lev Muravin, Ivan Krychevsky, and professors Maks Gelman, Kostiantyn Elev, and Mykhailo Sharonov.

Of great importance were postgraduate studies at the Academy of Architecture of the USSR, as well as communication with leading architects of the republic such as Volodymyr Zabolotny, Viktor Elizarov, Eugen Katonin, Yurii Aseev, and a study of folk architecture and related folk art, acquaintance with folk artists who worked in the experimental studio of the Academy of Architecture such as Viktoria Fedorova, Paraska Vlasenko, Omelyan Zheleznyak.

Coming to art in the postwar period, Kolomiets, who inherited the "path of war" in Berlin for many years dedicated herself to the theme of "peace". The first popularity of Inna Kolomiets came with a statuette "The First Letter" (1953), which was published in millions of copies.

== Career ==
After graduating from the Art Institute in 1951, Kolomiets participated in almost all major art exhibitions. In summer of 1958, the sculptor showed her work at a personal group exhibition, in which Kolomiets participated together with the artists of the same generation as Mаria Barynova and Galyna Morozova. Kolomiets presented small, majolica-made "fairy-tale" compositions based on Ukrainian classical poetry and fairy tales: "Mermaid and Water", "Humpback Whale", "Lukash and Mavka", "Firebird", " Dovbnya", "Girl in the field", "Motherhood" and others.

In honor of the 300th anniversary of the reunification of Ukraine with Russia, a group of artists and architects led by academician Volodymyr Zabolotny, which included Inna Kolomiets, performed a competitive project of the triumphal arch for Kyiv for which the group received the first prize.

In the early 1970s, due to a ban by the KGB, Inna Kolomiets became a "restricted person", but continued to travel extensively throughout the USSR.

Inna Kolomiets died on 1 August 2005 in Kyiv.

== Style ==
In the 1950s, Soviet sculpture was characterized by descriptive tendencies and features of the courageous ascetic ideal. Against this background, the works of Kolomiets seemed very fresh, in which she was already trying to convey her awareness of the individuality.

Inna Kolomiets' art is humorous (the merry irony of the Aeneid), infinitely dramatic (a series of works "Chernobyl", "Rivers") and philosophical (a monument to composers Maxim Berezovsky and Dmitry Bortnyansky in Hlukhiv). Inna Kolomiets sharply and in her own way saw new countries, cities, and types of people. A series of works after trips to France, Italy, Spain, Japan, and Egypt demonstrated new solutions that Kolomiets set for herself.

Both the French Flower Seller (1959), the Egyptian Woman (1962), the Old Geisha (1966), and On the Spanish Steps give women the role of a medium between the world of image and the viewer's consciousness, with a whole range of subtle manifestations. Life is embodied in the plasticity of the female body.

== Selected exhibitions ==
- 1951 - Winner of the competition for the creation of a sculptural composition for the cinema "Kyiv"
- 1961 - Republican art exhibition dedicated to the 200th anniversary of Ivan Kotlyarevsky (Kyiv)
- 1964 - Republican art exhibition dedicated to the 150th anniversary of Taras Shevchenko (Kyiv)
- 1965 - International Exhibition in Mongolia (Ulaanbaatar)
- 1970 - International Exhibition of Soviet Medal Art (Warsaw, Berlin, Budapest)
- 1974 - Republican Art Exhibition "Free Ukraine", dedicated to the 30th anniversary of the liberation of Soviet Ukraine from Nazi invaders (Kyiv)
- 1976 - All-Union Art Exhibition dedicated to the International Women's Day (Tbilisi)
- 1995 - monument to composers Maksym Berezovsky and Dmytro Bortnyansky in Hlukhiv (bronze, granite)
- 2000 - Personal exhibition in the Exhibition Hall "Artist" (Kyiv)

== Selected monuments ==
- 1974 - Monument to the artist I. Padalka in Zhornoklevy (bronze, granite)
- 1974 - monument to the writer A. Teslenko in Lokhvytsia (granite)
- 1975 - Monument to the beekeeper Prokopovich in Baturyn (bronze)
- 1978 - Monument to the kobzar Veresay in Sokyrnytsia (bronze)
