= Arch of Freedom of the Ukrainian People =

Monument in Kyiv

- Арка свободи українського народу
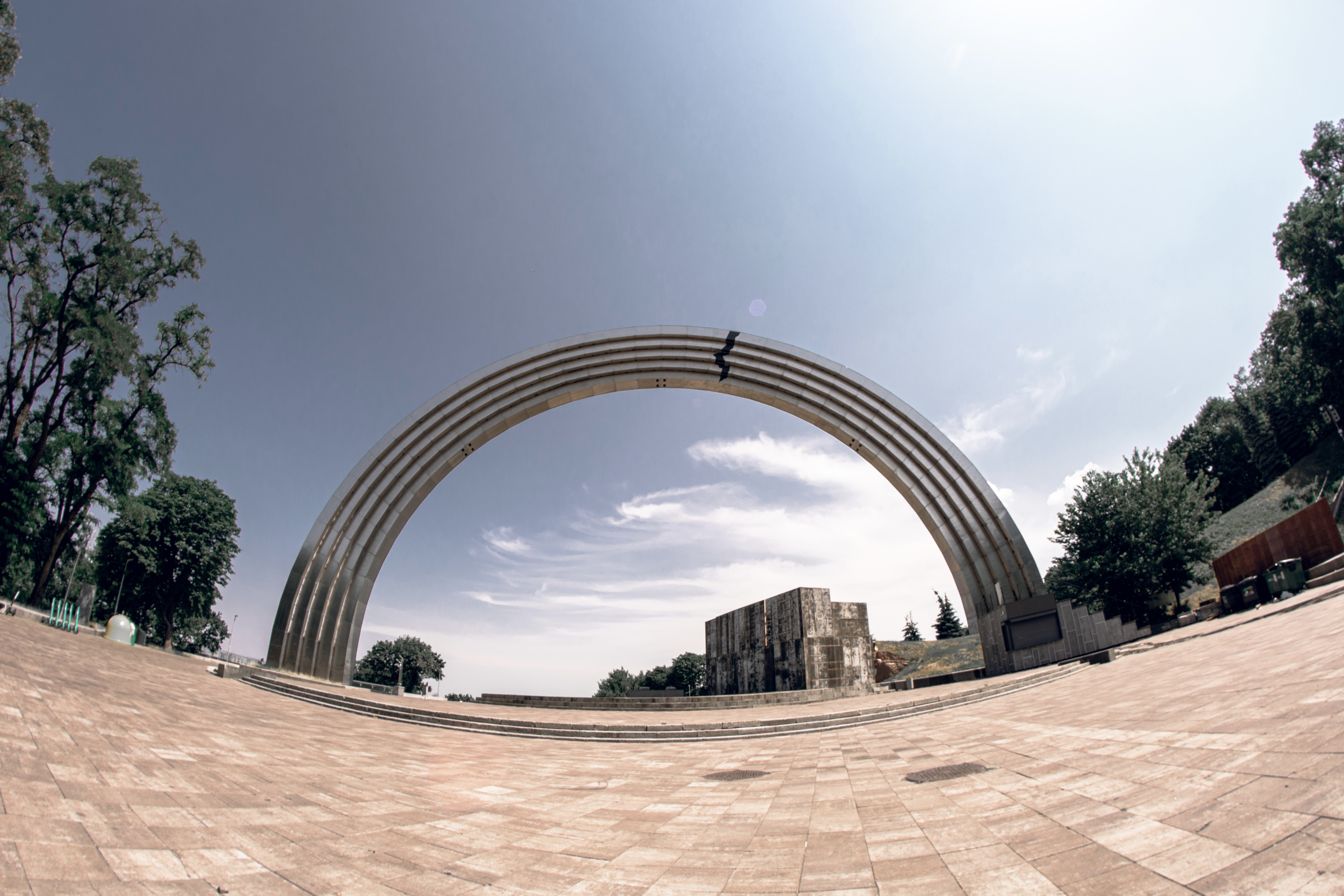
- The arch in 2022
- Interactive map of Arch of Freedom of the Ukrainian People
- Location: Khreshchatyi Park, Pechersk Raion, Kyiv, Ukraine
- Coordinates: 50°27′16″N 30°31′48″E
- Designer: Oleksandr Skoblikov (sculptor); Serhiy Myrhorodsky, Kostyantyn Sydorov, I.Ivanov (all - architects)
- Type: complex of three sculptural elements of the monument
- Material: metal, granite, bronze
- Height: 35 m (115 ft)
- Beginning date: 1978
- Completion date: 1982
- Opening date: Anniversary date of the October Revolution (7 November 1982)
- Dedicated to: Ukrainian people Pereiaslav Agreement (originally)
- Dismantled date: Partially: 26 April 2022; 30 April 2024
- Because of Ukrainian decommunization laws it shall not be rebuilt in its current form.

The Arch of Freedom of the Ukrainian People (Ukrainian: Арка свободи українського народу, romanized: Arka svobody ukrainskoho narodu, IPA: [ˈarkɐ swoˈbɔdɪ ʊkrɐˈjinʲsʲkoɦo nɐˈrɔdʊ]), formerly known as Peoples' Friendship Arch (Арка дружби народів, Arka druzhby narodiv), was a monument in Kyiv, the capital of Ukraine. It was opened on 7 November 1982, amidst the celebration of the 1,500th Anniversary of Kyiv, to commemorate the 60th Anniversary of the USSR and the "reunification of Ukraine with Russia in 1654" (the Pereiaslav Agreement as it was known in the Soviet Union).

The sculpture under the arch, which depicted a Ukrainian worker and a Russian worker standing together, was dismantled in April 2022 amidst the Russian invasion of Ukraine. On 17 April 2024 the Ministry of Culture and Information Policy removed the official status of the monument and allowed its dismantling. On 25 April 2024 the Kyiv City State Administration announced that the monument would not be demolished but would "receive a new concept." This despite the Ukrainian Institute of National Memory had been advocating "complete dismantling." On 30 April 2024 the sculptural composition (weighing more than 6,000 tons) of 20 elements that honoured the Pereiaslav Agreement was dismantled.

== Name ==
Since 14 May 2022, according to the decision of the Kyiv City Council, the monument is named the Arch of Freedom of the Ukrainian People.

The official name from opening date in 1982 until its renaming was Peoples' Friendship Arch, colloquially the monument was referred to as the Rainbow (Ukrainian: Райдуга, romanized: Raiduha) or the Yoke (Ukrainian: Ярмо, romanized: Yarmo).

== Description ==
The Friendship Arch was constructed in 1982 as part of group of structures by sculptor Oleksandr Skoblikov and architects Serhiy Myrhorodskyi, Ihor Ivanov, and Kostiantyn Sydorov. The complex consisted of three elements:

- A 50 m (164 ft) in diameter, rainbow-shaped arch, made of titanium.
- A bronze statue depicting a Russian and a Ukrainian worker holding up the Soviet Order of Friendship of Peoples
- A granite stele depicting the participants of the Pereyaslav Council of 1654.

The surviving arch is located next to a viewing deck where most of Kyiv's east bank can be viewed, Troieschyna and towards the north of the city, Podil and Obolon.

The monument was unveiled by the First Secretary of the Communist Party Volodymyr Shcherbytsky amidst the celebration of the 1,500th Anniversary of Kyiv, on 7 November 1982, to commemorate the 60th Anniversary of the USSR and the reunification of Ukraine with Russia in 1654. Although the USSR was proclaimed on 30 December 1922; 7 November 1982 was the 65th anniversary of the October Revolution of 1917. The monument was opened together with the All-Union Lenin Museum (today, Ukrainian House).

== Location ==
The whole People's Friendship Arch complex (and its surviving arch) was located on top of the right bank of the Dnieper river overlooking the Park Bridge (a pedestrian bridge that connects the city with Trukhaniv Island) and the Shore Highway (Ukrainian: Набережне шосе, romanized: Naberezhne shose). This location is behind the buildings complex of the National Philharmonic Society of Ukraine in Khreshchatyi Park (Ukrainian: Хрещатий парк) which at the time of opening was called the Pioneer Park (Ukrainian: Піонерський парк).

== Dismantling ==
On 20 May 2016, the Ukrainian government announced plans to dismantle the arch as part of its decommunization laws. In its place, a memorial dedicated to veterans of the Russo-Ukrainian War was planned. The Director of the Ukrainian Institute of National Remembrance Volodymyr Viatrovych stated in February 2018, that "a sculptural group" of the monument should be removed according to the decommunization laws.

For the Eurovision Song Contest 2017, the arch was temporarily painted as a rainbow and renamed the Arch of Diversity. It doubled as the symbol of the Kyiv Pride parade, and was illuminated as a rainbow at night.

In 2018, human rights activists put a temporary sticker on the arch that looked like a crack. This was a sign of support for political prisoners who are illegally detained in Russia and annexed Crimea. According to the organizers, the action aims to draw attention to the fate of Ukrainian citizens, as well as to urge everyone to make as much effort as possible to free political prisoners in Russia.

After the Russian invasion of Ukraine, on 25 April 2022, mayor of Kyiv, Vitali Klitschko, announced the dismantling of the sculptural part of the monument as having lost its ideological meaning. The next day, during the dismantling of a bronze sculptural group, the head of a figure symbolizing a Russian fell off. The arch itself was planned to be renamed and highlighted with the color of the Ukrainian flag. Klitschko proposed to the Kyiv City Council to rename the arch of the People's Friendship Arch into the Arch of Freedom of the Ukrainian People (Ukrainian: Арка свободи українського народу, romanized: Arka svobody ukraïnskoho narodu). One of the designers of the monument, Serhiy Myrhorodsky, agreed with the dismantling of the monument.

The People's Friendship Arch was one of 60 monuments that the Kyiv City Council planned (in April 2022) to remove. On 14 May 2022, according to the decision of the Kyiv City Council, it was named the Arch of Freedom of the Ukrainian People.

An expert commission of the Ukrainian Institute of National Memory (UINM) concluded on 29 March 2024 that although the monument was renamed it did still "belong to the symbols of Russian imperial policy and is subject to complete dismantling." The commission noted that it "therefore poses a threat to Ukraine's national security." Prior UINM head Anton Drobovych had stated that it would be a good idea to reformat the monument into a rainbow and that such "an artistic solution" would have "clearly separated Ukraine from modern Russia, in which representatives of the LGBTQ+ community are persecuted."

On 17 April 2024 the Ministry of Culture and Information Policy removed the monument from its State Register of Immovable Monuments of Ukraine, adding that the monument "represents exclusively Soviet ideologues" and allowing for it to be dismantled.

On 25 April 2024 the Kyiv City State Administration announced that the monument would not be demolished because "its meaning has been reinterpreted." They also stated that "the space near it will receive a new concept."

On 30 April 2024 the sculptural composition (that was part of the overall monument) in honor of the Pereiaslav Agreement was removed. This (former part) of the monument consisted of 20 elements that weighed at total of almost 7,000 tons. It was stored in the Ukraine State Aviation Museum.

== Gallery ==
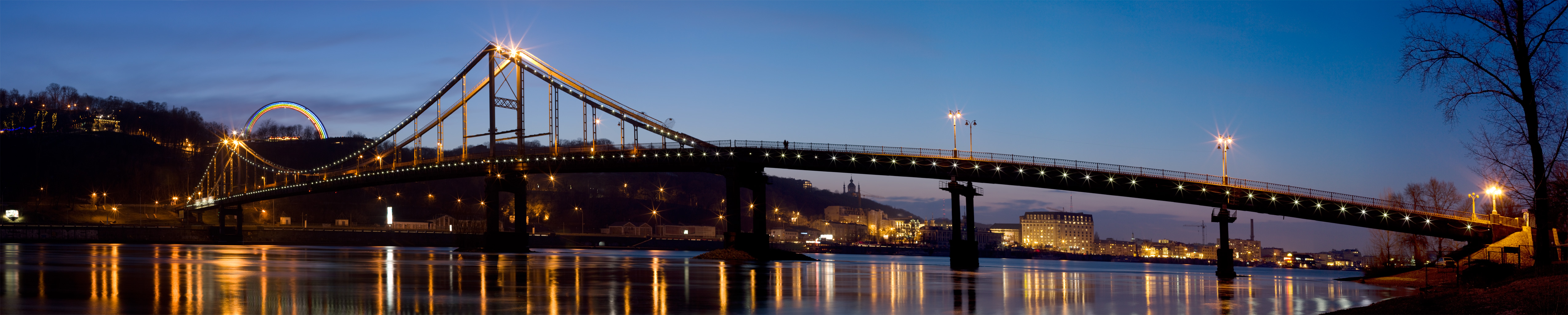
Park Bridge seen from Trukhaniv Island
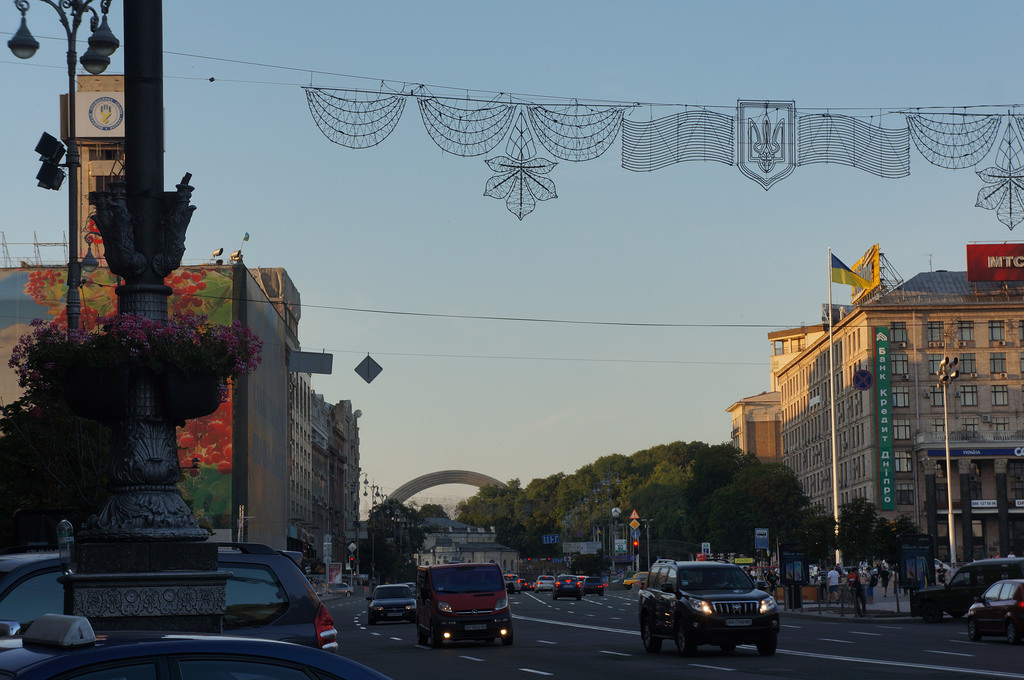
The monument as seen from Maidan Nezalezhnosti (in 2015)

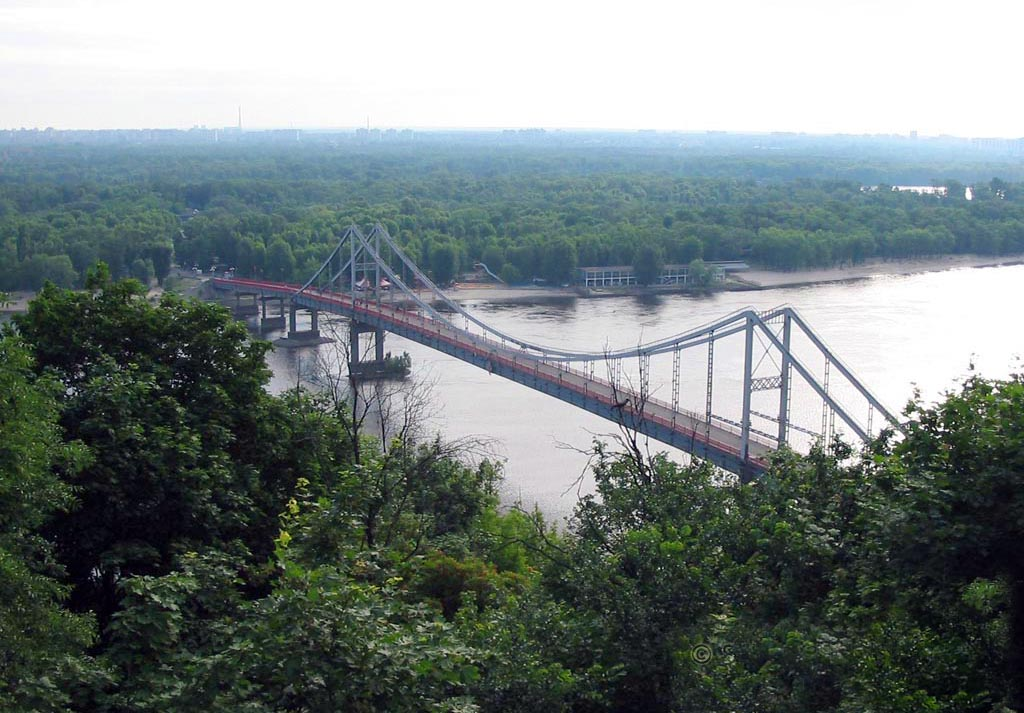
Park Bridge

== See also ==
- Derussification in Ukraine
- Decommunization in Ukraine
- Afghanistan War Memorial, Kyiv
- Valerii Lobanovskyi Dynamo Stadium
