= Kyiv Day =

Holiday in the Ukrainian capital Kyiv

Kyiv Day (День Києва)
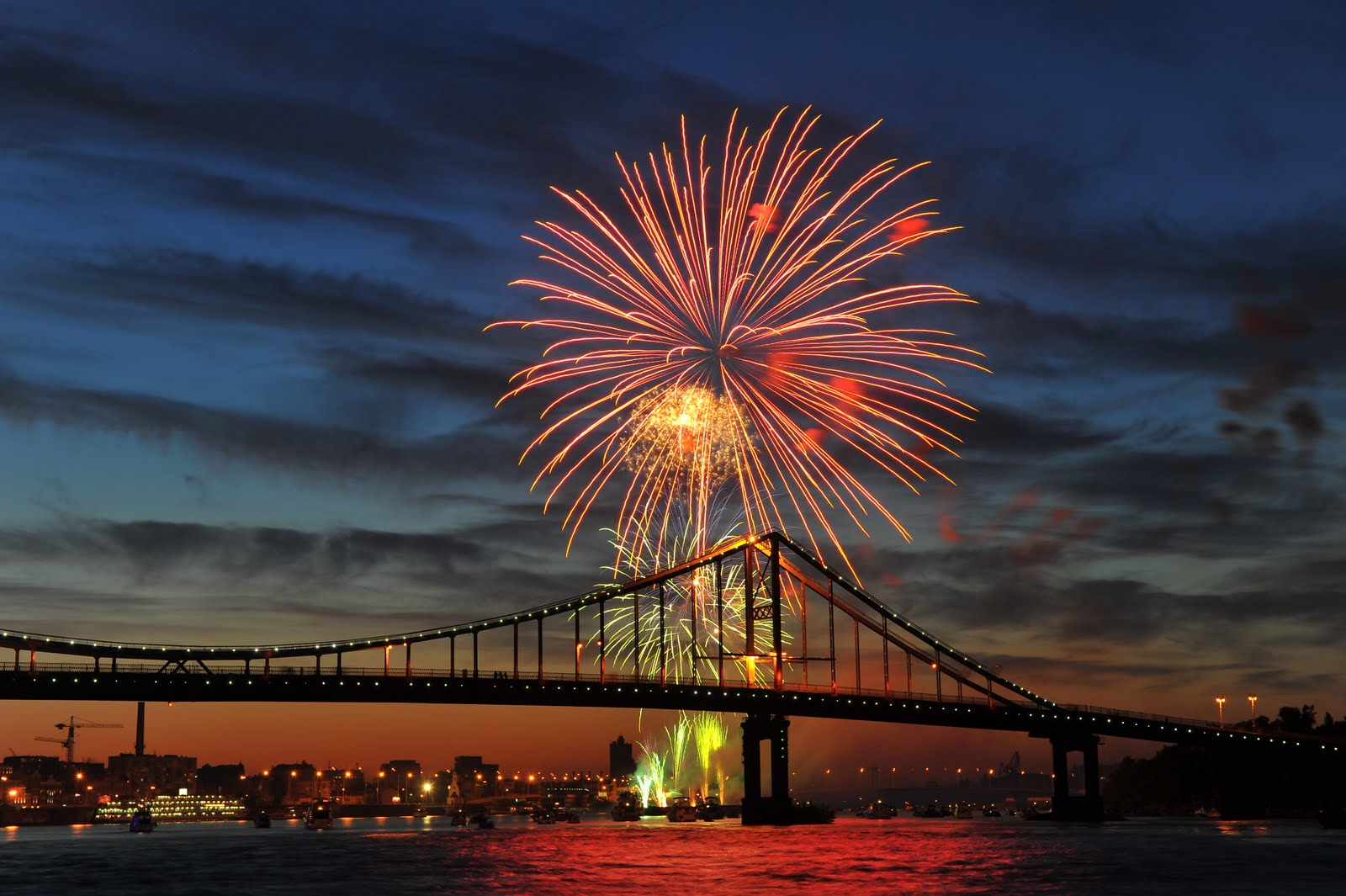
- Official name: Day of Kyiv
- Observed by: Kyivan residents
- Begins: Last weekend of May
- Frequency: annual

Kyiv Day, or officially the Day of Kyiv (Ukrainian: День Києва, romanized: Den Kyieva, pronounced [dɛnʲ ˈkɪjewɐ]), is a holiday in the Ukrainian capital Kyiv that is usually celebrated in the last Sunday of May.

The Kyiv Day was established in May 1982 similarly to other holidays celebrated in many cities and towns across Ukraine. Celebrations typically last for two days and take place during the last weekend of May; actors and musicians perform out in the streets on this day. City residents and suburban tourists travel to the city to see performances and a firework show that takes place in the evening (around 22:00 Eastern European Time). The first celebration of Kyiv Day took place in May 1982, which marked the celebration of the 1500th anniversary of Kyiv.
