= Stanislav Tsalyk =

Ukrainian writer, essayist and historian

- Born: Kyiv, Ukraine
- Education: Gerasimov Institute of Cinematography (1996)
- Occupations: Writer, screenwriter, essayist, historian
- Writing career
- Period: 1992–present
- Genre: non-fiction

Stanislav Tsalyk (Ukrainian: Станісла́в Микола́йович Ца́лик) is a Ukrainian writer, essayist, local history expert, and BBC history writer.

He has been a member of the National Filmmakers Union of Ukraine (screenwriter) since 1997 and a member of the Association of European Journalists since 2013.

He is a winner of Kyiv City Ivan Mykolaichuk Award (Film Arts, 2016).

A member of the Ukrainian Film Academy since 2017.

He has written several books and published 1,000+ articles and historical non-fiction essays in the leading Ukrainian media. His stories reveal unknown pages of Ukrainian and Kyiv history and life of famous historical figures.

== Biography ==
Stanislav Tsalyk is a native Kyivan. He attended Secondary School No. 48 (1969–1977) and Technical High School No. 178 (1977–1979) and holds two university degrees: one in Economic Cybernetics from the Ukrainian Agricultural Academy (1985) and the other from Gerasimov Institute of Cinematography (Scriptwriting, prof. Valentin Chernykh, screenwriter of Moscow Does Not Believe in Tears - Academy Award for Best Foreign Language Film, 1980).

== Literary work ==
Stanislav Tsalyk specializes in documentary/nonfiction writing. His primary field of interests is the history of Kyiv, the history of ethnic minorities and unknown pages of the Ukrainian history. He explores daily life at different historical times rather than political or military conflicts and actively works with published and verbal memoirs, archived documents, newspapers, and photos.

His literary style is characterized by am emphasis on lesser-known episodes of the past, the examination of understudied subjects, detailed chronology, and comparisons between historical events. His publications frequently incorporate the factual detail and are structured using elements of dramatic composition.

== Publications and books ==
Stanislav Tsalyk (the Polish spelling of the author's name is Stanisław Calik) has been published since May 1992. Over his professional career as a history writer and journalist, he wrote history columns in many printed and online media. Today he is a BBC history writer (http://www.bbc.com/ukrainian). His publications are in English, Ukrainian, Polish, and Russian. Many articles are available online.

His historical guide "Евпатория: Прогулки по Малому Иерусалиму" (Yevpatoria: Walks in Little Jerusalem, in Russian) (2007) was republished several times and became a bestseller in Crimea. The updated revised edition was published in 2012. The presentation took place in Kyiv on September 4, 2012, at Baboon Coffee House.

The book "Таємниці письменницьких шухляд. Детективна історія української літератури" (Secrets of Writer's Drawers: a Detective Story of the Ukrainian Literature, in Ukrainian) (2010, 2011, co-writer) was on everyone's lips and became one of the most interesting events in the Ukrainian literature in 2010–2011. The book was presented on November 4, 2010, at the Ukrainian National Literature Museum.

The book "Киев: конспект 70-х" (Kyiv: Summary of the 1970s, in Russian) (2012) has been the first publication entirely focused on the daily life of Kyiv and its residents in the Soviet 1970s. The book hit the shortlist and won The Book of the Year Award at the 14th Ukrainian National Rating (2012). The presentation took place on March 31, 2012, at Ukrainian House.

 Video presentation: https://www.youtube.com/watch?v=8lLBtXP6DxA.

The book "Інший Київ" (A Different Kyiv, in Ukrainian/English) (2012, co-writer) is an alternative guide to today's life of Ukraine's capital – city of Kyiv. The book was published in a bilingual format (Ukrainian/English). Stanislav Tsalyk wrote the chapter entitled "Місто багатьох барв" (City of Many Colours) as a self-guided walking tour about the history of ethnic communities in Kyiv. The guide was presented on May 21, 2012, at Baboon Coffee House.

The book "Veni, Vidi, Scripsi: Де, як і чому працюють українці" (Veni, Vidi, Scripsi: Where, How and Why Do the Ukrainians Work, in Ukrainian, 2014, co-writer) is a selection of top ten literary reportages written by Ukrainian writers and shortlisted by Samovydets All-Ukrainian Literary Reportage Contest. Stanislav Tsalyk's reportage "Геракл відпочивав давно. Хроніки довоєнного відпочинку" (Herakles Had Rest a Long Time Ago: Chronicles of Pre-War Summer Holidays, in Ukrainian) is about Crimea and its people shortly before Russia's annexation. The presentation took place in September 2014 at the 21st International Book Forum, Lviv.

The book "Наш Крим: неросійські історії українського півострова" (Our Crimea: Non-Russian Stories of the Ukrainian Peninsula, in Ukrainian 2016, co-writer) is a collection of the best Ukrainian history journalists’ writings about Crimea. The book covers the period from the establishment of the Crimean Khanate to Ukraine's independence in 1991. Stanislav Tsalyk contributed three articles: "Решилися Мы взять под державу Нашу полуостров Крымский" (We Decided to Take the Crimean Peninsula under Our State, in Ukrainian) "Росії заборонили мати флот на Чорному морі" (Russia was Prohibited to Have its Fleet on the Black Sea, in Ukrainian), "Дерев'яний паркан відділяв чоловічий пляж від жіночого" (A Wooden Fence Dividing Men’s Beach from the Women’s One, in Ukrainian).

 Video presentation: https://www.youtube.com/watch?v=WrmFFqG3qP4

In 2019, he translated the memories of the famous Lviv architect Wawrzyniec Dayczak "Początek II wojny światowej i okupacji sowieckiej we Lwowie" (The Beginning of World War II and the Soviet Occupation in Lviv) from Polish. This project was financed by the Consulate General of Poland in Lviv and the Polish Institute in Kyiv and presented on September 22, 2019, at the 26th Lviv International Book Forum.

The book "Історія Криму першої половини ХХ ст. Нариси" (History of Crimea in the First Half of the 20th Century. Sketches, in Ukrainian, 2020, co-writer) is a learning aid for 10th grade students attending secondary schools in Ukraine. It was published with the USAID's financial support.

The book "Тільки у Львові: Тонько, Щепко і всі-всі-всі" (Only in Lviv: Tonko, Szczepko and all the Others, in Ukrainian, 2020, e-book, co-writer) was published with the support of the Lviv City Council and Focus on Culture Program.

The book "Tylko we Lwowie. Tońko, Szczepko i wszyscy inni" (Only in Lviv. Tońko, Szczepko and all the Others, in Polish, 2024, co-writer). — Łódź, Księży Młyn Dom Wydawniczy.

  More information : https://www.km.com.pl/ksiazka-53-702-tylko_we_lwowie_tonko_szczepko_i_wszyscy_inni.html
  Review : https://oldcamera.pl/pl/tylko-we-lwowie-wesolo-nostalgiczna-historia-szczepka-i-tonka-recenzja/

The book "Zula Pogorzelska. Polska Mistinguett". — Białystok, Tomasz Brański, 2024 (in Polish, a comic book based on the article by Stanisław Calik "Nikt w Warszawie tak nie śpiewał" (No one in Warsaw has ever sung like that), Tygodnik Powszechny, nr 32 (3865), 6 sierpnia 2023 r., s.56-59)

   More information : https://stare-kino.pl/zula-pogorzelska-polska-mistinguett-tomasz-branski/
   Article : https://www.tygodnikpowszechny.pl/nikt-w-warszawie-nie-spiewal-tak-jak-zula-pogorzelska-184136

The book "Таємниці письменницьких шухляд. Літературне повсякдення в країні здійсненої антиутопії" (Secrets of Writers' Drawers. Literary Everyday Life in the Country of Fulfilled Anti-utopia, in Ukrainian, co-writer). — Київ, Ще одну сторінку, 2025 / Kyiv, Sche Odnu Storinku, 2025

== Scriptwriting ==
Stanislav Tsalyk wrote 30+ film and TV scripts and consulted many TV projects as an expert in Kyiv history.

In 1994–1995, he worked as a scriptwriter and a TV presenter for "Фильмоскоп" (A Filmstrip Projector), a TV show about movies at UT-3 Channel.

In 1994, he was a scriptwriter of the full-length feature film "Judenkreis, або Вічне колесо" (85', directed by Vasyl Dombrovsky, Dovzhenko Film Studio, 1997).

 Link to the film: http://megogo.net/ru/view/17945-yudenkrays-ili-vechnoe-koleso.html

In 2013, he was a scriptwriter of the full-length documentary film Hollywood on the Dnieper. Dreams from Atlantis (89', directed by Oleg Chorny, Directory Films, 2013). The premiere screening took place in July 2014 at Odesa International Film Festival.

 Film review in The Hollywood Reporter: http://www.hollywoodreporter.com/review/hollywood-dnieper-dreams-atlantis-gollivud-724142

 Trailer: https://www.youtube.com/watch?v=xOL7ddJyaFI

 Wikipedia: https://uk.wikipedia.org/wiki/Голівуд_над_Дніпром._Сни_з_Атлантиди (Ukrainian)

In 2015, he participated in Golos: Ukrainian Voices, a full-length documentary film (70', directed by Dolya Gavanski, Thea Films, 2015, UK) by contributing archive materials for the film.

 Film’s website: http://golosthemovie.com

 Film’s trailer: https://www.youtube.com/watch?v=A4ynV5kmDSU

In 2016, he wrote the script of the full-length documentary From Babi Yar to Freedom (89’, directed by Oleg Chorny, Pronto Film, 2017). This is the first film about the hard life of Anatoliy Kuznetsov (1929-1979), a writer who fled from the USSR to the UK to publish his book Babi Yar: A Document in the form of a Novel in the full uncensored version. The film features the writer's son Alexei Kuznetsov.

In 2020, he wrote the script of the full-length documentary film To See the Sky (in progress, directed by Oleg Chorny, Pronto Film).

== Hobbies ==
Being fascinated by the past of cities and towns, Stanislav Tsalyk travels a lot in Ukraine and other countries. He particular likes Kyiv and guides his original historical walks discovering unknown pages of the past and people living in the city. He collects artefacts of Kyiv's history of the 20th century which he actively uses as illustrations to his publications and books.

== Awards ==
- Best Film Script of the Year Award by the Ministry of Culture of Ukraine (1994)
- Winner of the 1st Ukrainian Journalistic Competition "Mass Media for Ethnic Tolerance and Social Cohesion" (2005)
- Kyiv: Summary of the 1970s won The Book of the Year Award at the 14th All-Ukrainian Rating (2012)
- Certificate of Recognition from Samovydets (The Eyewitness) Second Literary Reportage Contest (2013)
- Kyiv City Ivan Mykolaichuk Award (Film Arts, 2016)
- A winner of the Lviv 2020: Focus on Culture Art Contest (2020).

== Books ==
- 100 великих украинцев. – Москва: Вече, Киев: Орфей, 2002 (соавтор) / The 100 Great Ukrainians. – Moscow: Veche, Kyiv, Orphey, 2002 (co-writer)
- 100 найвідоміших українців. – К.: Автограф, Орфей, 2005 (соавтор) / The 100 Most-Known Ukrainians. – Kyiv, Autograph, Orphey, 2005 (co-writer)
- Куля в Максима Рильского: Невідоме з життя літературніх класиків. – К.: Перше Вересня, 2005 (співавтор) / The bullet to Maksym Rylsky: Unknown Pages in the Life of Literary Classics. – Kyiv, Pershe Veresnia, 2005 (co-writer)
- Kyiv. Travel Guide. – Kyiv, Uniwell Production, 2005
- Евпатория: Прогулки по Малому Иерусалиму. – Симферополь: Оригинал-М, 2007 / Yevpatoria: Walks in Little Jerusalem. – Simferopol', Original-M, 2007
- Таємниці письменницьких шухляд. Детективна історія української літератури – К.: Наш час, 2010, 2011 (співавтор) / Secrets of Writer's Drawers: a Detective Story of the Ukrainian Literature – Kyiv,: Nash Chas, 2010, 2011 (co-writer)
- Киев: конспект 70-х. – К.: ВАРТО, 2012 / Kyiv: Summary of the 1970s. – Kyiv, VARTO, 2012

 More information about the book:  https://web.archive.org/web/20120418134801/http://zn.ua/SOCIETY/zhivaya_istoriya_kieva,___ili_pronzitelnyy_konspekt_1970-h-100067.html

 http://www.kommersant.ua/doc/1918698http://2000.net.ua/weekend/gorod-sobytija/khronograf/79795

- Different Kyiv. Alternative Guide to Kyiv. – Kyiv, CCA, 2012 (co-writer)

 The e-version of the book in a pdf format is available at:  http://arttemenos.files.wordpress.com/2012/05/anna_lisyuk-inshy_kiiv.pdf

- Евпатория: Прогулки по Малому Иерусалиму. Новое издание. – Симферополь: Бизнес-Информ, 2012 (издание расширенное и переработанное) / Yevpatoria: Walks in Little Jerusalem. Updated Edition. – Simferopol', Business-Inform, 2012 (expanded and revised edition)
- Veni, Vidi, Scripsi: Де, як і чому працюють українці. - К.: Темпора, 2014 (співавтор) / Veni, Vidi, Scripsi: Where, How and Why Do the Ukrainians Work. – Kyiv, Tempora Publishing House, 2014 (co-writer)
- Наш Крим: неросійські історії українського півострова. - К.: К.І.С., 2016 (співавтор) / Our Crimea: Non-Russian Stories of the Ukrainian Peninsula. - Kyiv, K.I.S.,2016 (co-writer)
- Історія Криму першої половини ХХ ст. Нариси. - К.: Академія української преси, 2020 (співавтор) / History of Crimea in the First Half of the 20th Century. Sketches. - Kyiv, AUP, 2020 (co-writer)
- Тільки у Львові: Тонько, Щепко і всі-всі-всі. - К.: К.І.С., 2020 (співавтор) / Only in Lviv: Tonko, Szczepko and all the Others. - Kyiv, K.I.S., 2020 (co-writer)

== Interview and performance ==
- Stanislav Tsalyk talks about Kyiv fears, legends and mysteries (in Ukrainian)
- Stanislav Tsalyk: "Baron Munchausen and Grigoriy Skovoroda met on the Kontraktova square" (in Ukrainian)
- Stanislav Tsalyk talks about multicultural traditions of Kyiv // tolerancja.pl (Polish)
- Stanislav Tsalyk: "People’s character is shaped by the landscape" (in Russian)
- Stanislav Tsalyk in the Project "People in the City" // НашКиев.ua (in Russian)
- Stanislav Tsalyk: "Take the History by its Sleeve" (in Ukrainian)
- NEW YEAR'S: HOW UKRAINIANS TOAST TO NEW BEGINNINGS IN THE NEW YEAR (English)
- Stanislav Tsalyk talks about Stanislaw Lem (English)
- Stanislav Tsalyk talks about Leopold von Sacher-Masoch (English)
- Polish investments in Kyiv metro: Troeschina is getting closer (Polish, Ukrainian)
- Little Jerusalem on the west coast of Crimea (in Ukrainian)
- Video about presentation of book Kyiv: summary of 70th – interview with author (in Russian)
- A part of the video lecture "Kyiv during the Time of UkrSSR Leaders Shelest and Shcherbitsky: Official and Unofficial Sides of Capital’s Life", Ye Book Store, June 7, 2012. TVi Channel (in Ukrainian)
- Stanislav Tsalyk: "Fact recording has become my favorite genre" (in Ukrainian)
- Stanislav Tsalyk: "The Donbass conflict has no history" (in Russian)
- A historical detective with Stanislav Tsalyk. Outstanding Kyivans and their Secrets: Anatoliy Kuznetsov's Novel "Babi Yar" (in Ukrainian)
