= Anna K (designer) =

Ukrainian fashion designer (born 1995)

Anna Karenina
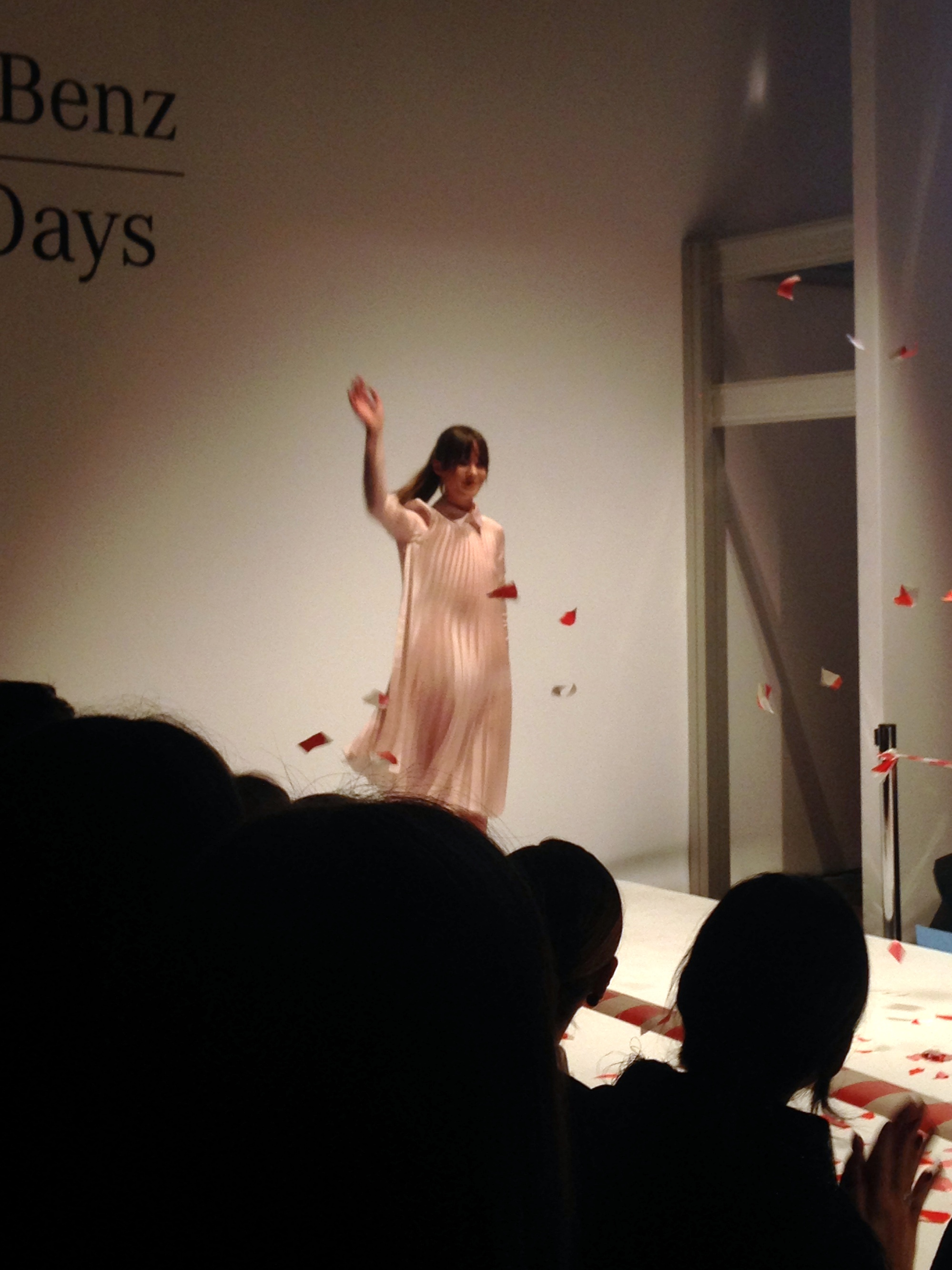
- Anna Karenina at MBKFD S/S 2015
- Born: November 20, 1995 (age 30); Kremenchuk, Ukraine
- Other name: Anna K
- Occupation: Fashion designer
- Parent: Viktor Nikolaevich Kolomoets
- Awards: Forbes 30 Under 30; Mercedes Benz Fashion Prize (2015)

Anna Karenina (Ukrainian: Анна Карєніна, romanized: Anna Karenina), (born November 20, 1995) also known as Anna K, is a Ukrainian fashion designer. Anna K In 2017, Anna Karenina was included in the Forbes "30 Under 30" list in the Art category.

== Biography ==
Anna Karenina (Kolomoiets) was born in Kremenchuk, Ukraine, on November 20, 1995. She graduated from the local art school, and then entered the college of the Kyiv National University of Technologies and Design in Kyiv. At 14, she began her modeling career and appeared on the cover of the "Top 10" magazine.

== ANNA K brand history ==
In 2012, at 16, Anna K presented her first collection within the Fashion Scout of the Mercedes-Benz Kiev Fashion Days. In February 2013, Anna K for the first time presented her collection within the Fashion Scout of the London Fashion Week. During the same season she presented her collection on the big catwalk of Mercedes-Benz Kiev Fashion Days, which was praised by Vogue Italia fashion editor Elena Bara.

The Anna K brand won the competition for young designers Design It in October 2013. Inspired by article "The Circus of Fashion" of Vogue international editor Suzy Menkes, Anna presented a series of t-shirts Fashion Circus at Pitti Immagine W in Florence in January 2014. After the presentation, the collection was ordered by European concept stores Luisa Via Roma and Colette. During 2014 there were more than 3,000 t-shirts sold.

In February 2015, Anna K presented "The Little Match Girl" collection, inspired by the eponymous fairy tale of Hans Christian Andersen. At the moment, the collections of Anna K are presented at 40 stores in 25 countries.

== Collaborations ==
- In January 2015, Anna K presented a capsule collection of T-shirts and sweatshirts created in collaboration with the French brand Les (Art)Ists.
- Together with Ukrainian artist Eugenia Gapchinska, Anna K created a special collection "Happy Active Wear" for SS'16.
- In 2017, designer Anna K presented the capsule collection SPACE ROCKET in collaboration with German brand Cybex at an event in Berlin.
- Another collaboration of footwear brand L.A.P.T.I.&Anna K was presented at Mercedes Benz Kiev Fashion Days. The entire collection consisted of shoes that have a unique print of Eugenia Gapchinska drawings.
- In February 2016, inspired by an article in Vogue.com, young designers, Anna Karenina & Nicolò Beretta, created a joint project for Anna K show in New York Fashion Week and presented it at Villa Gross (Ukraine).
