= Miniature sheet =

Postage stamps still attached to its printsheet

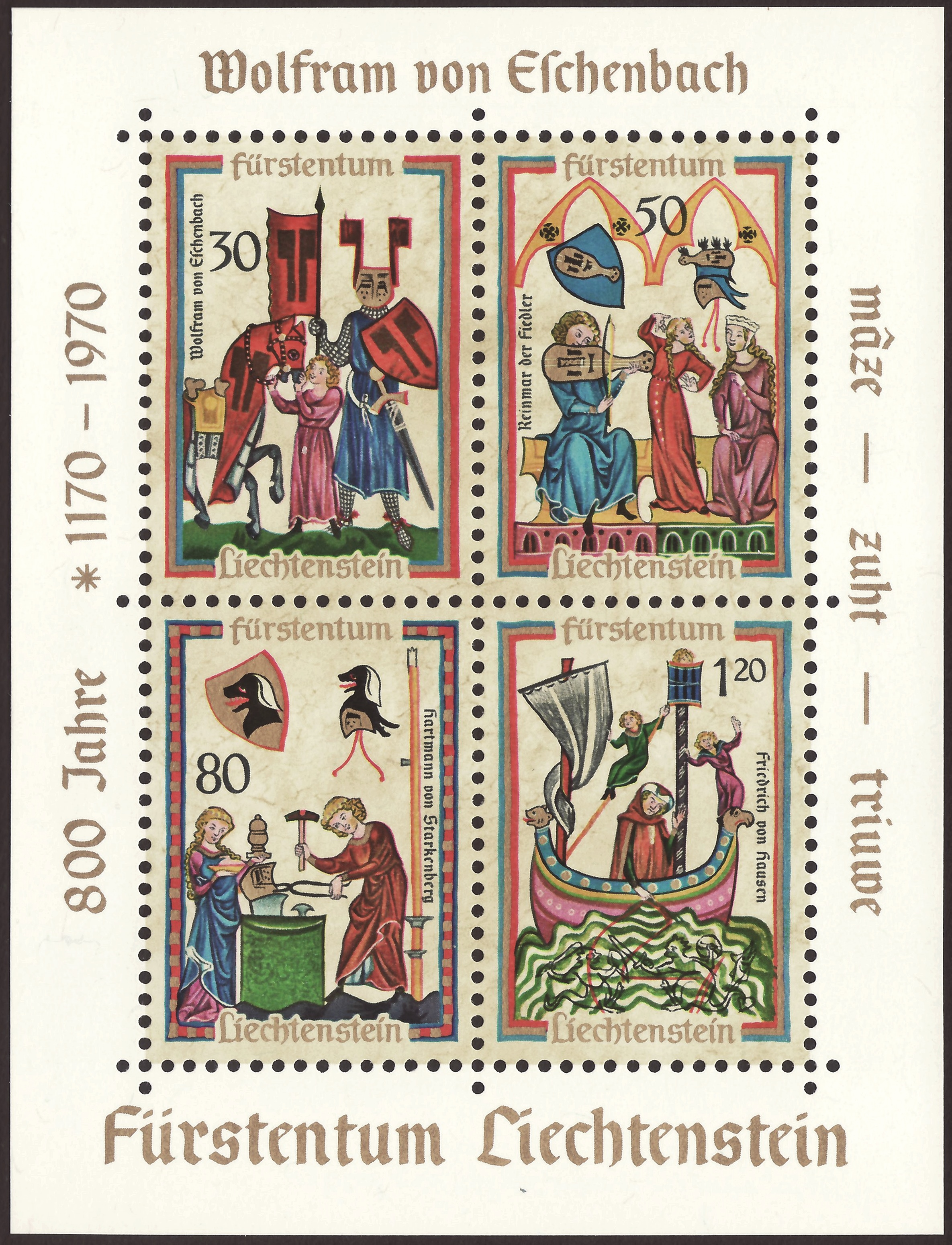
Liechtenstein miniature sheet with four stamps "Illustrations of the Codex Manesse - 800th Anniversary of Wolfram von Eschenbach" (1970)

A souvenir sheet or miniature sheet is a postage stamp or a small group of postage stamps still attached to the sheet on which they were printed. They may be either regular issues that just happen to be printed in small groups (typical of many early stamps), or special issues often commemorating some event, such as a national anniversary, philatelic exhibition, or government program. The number of stamps ranges from one to about 25; larger sheets of stamps are simply called "sheets" with no qualifier.

The stamps on the sheet may be perforated in the usual way, or imperforate. The margins or selvage of the sheet may have additional printing, ranging from a simple statement of the occasion being commemorated, up to a full picture of which the stamp(s) are just a small part. The margins of the sheet may have ornamental designs, price, emblems and logo(s) which are not part of stamp(s). Stamps on the miniature sheet can be in se-tenant position while the same stamps were not se-tenants in regular issue.

Both the stamps and the entire sheet are valid for mailing, although they are almost always sold above face value and kept in mint collection by collectors; a handful of usages may be found as philatelic covers.

Luxembourg issued the first generally recognized souvenir sheet in 1923, a single 10-franc stamp, not otherwise available, inset in a larger blank sheet. The purpose was to honor the birth of Princess Elisabeth. However, this country had produced a somewhat similar issue in 1921, a small sheet of 5 stamps to celebrate the birth of Prince Jean, and an even earlier sheet of 10 stamps for the accession of William IV in 1906. Neither had margin inscriptions and both consisted of regular issue stamps that were otherwise available. Since the 1920s many other countries have produced souvenir sheets. The United States issued its first one in 1926, and printed several more in the 1930s, with new ones occasionally issued since that time. Since 1955 the United Nations has occasionally produced them.

While some of the earliest souvenir sheets are valuable (for instance in excellent condition the US White Plains sheet of 1926 is worth hundreds of dollars), modern ones are typically produced in considerable quantities and have no special value.

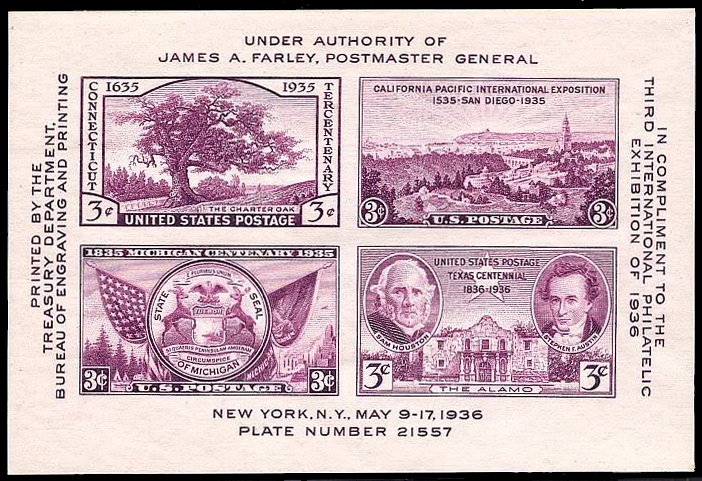
This US souvenir sheet of 1936, issued for the TIPEX exhibition, consists of four contemporary commemoratives, imperforate.

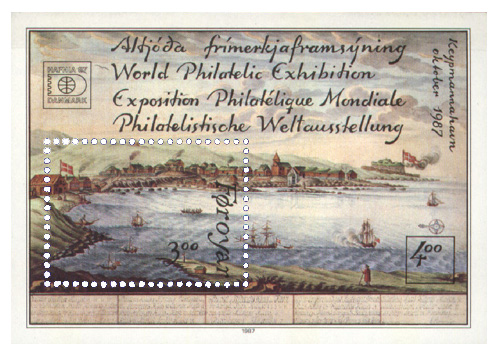
A miniature sheet from the Faroe Islands, in which the stamp forms a part of the larger image

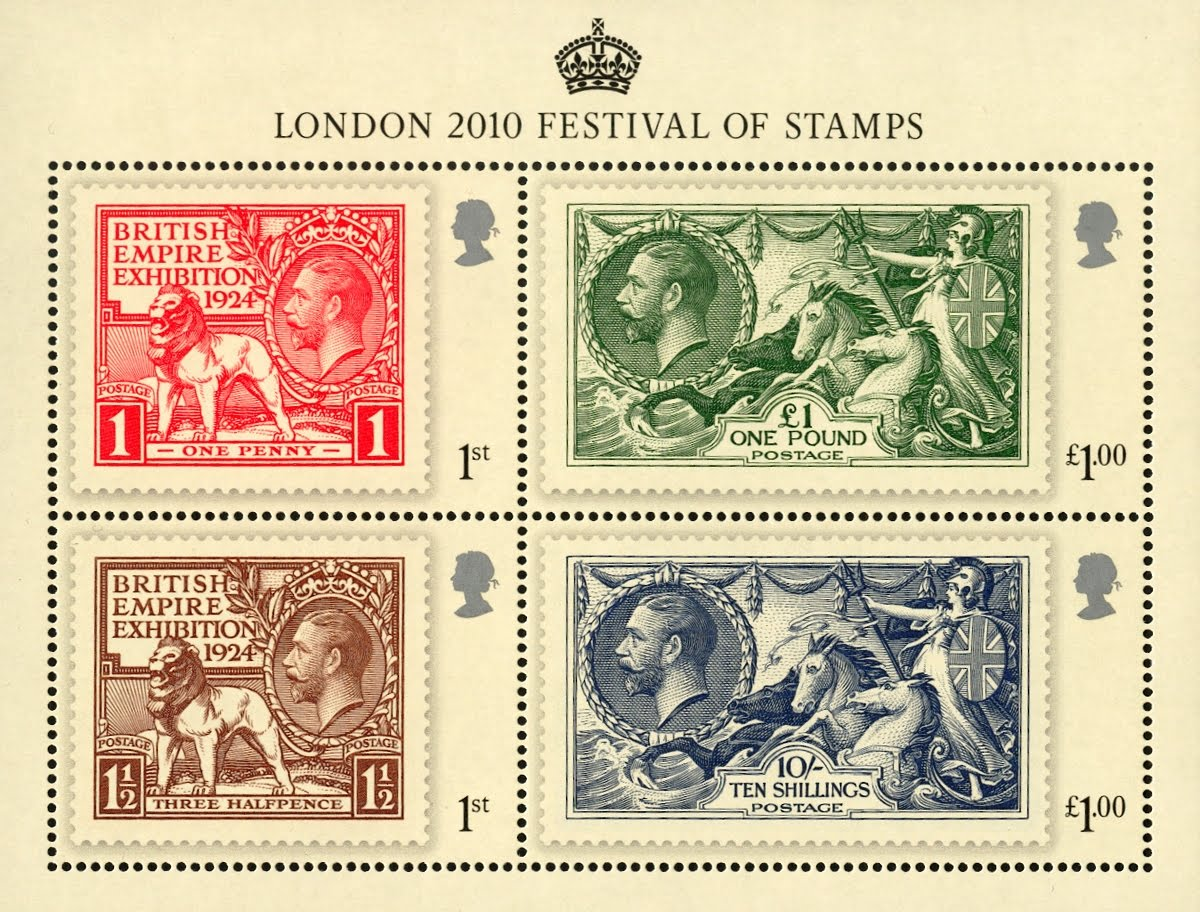
The British miniature sheet for the London 2010 Festival of Stamps

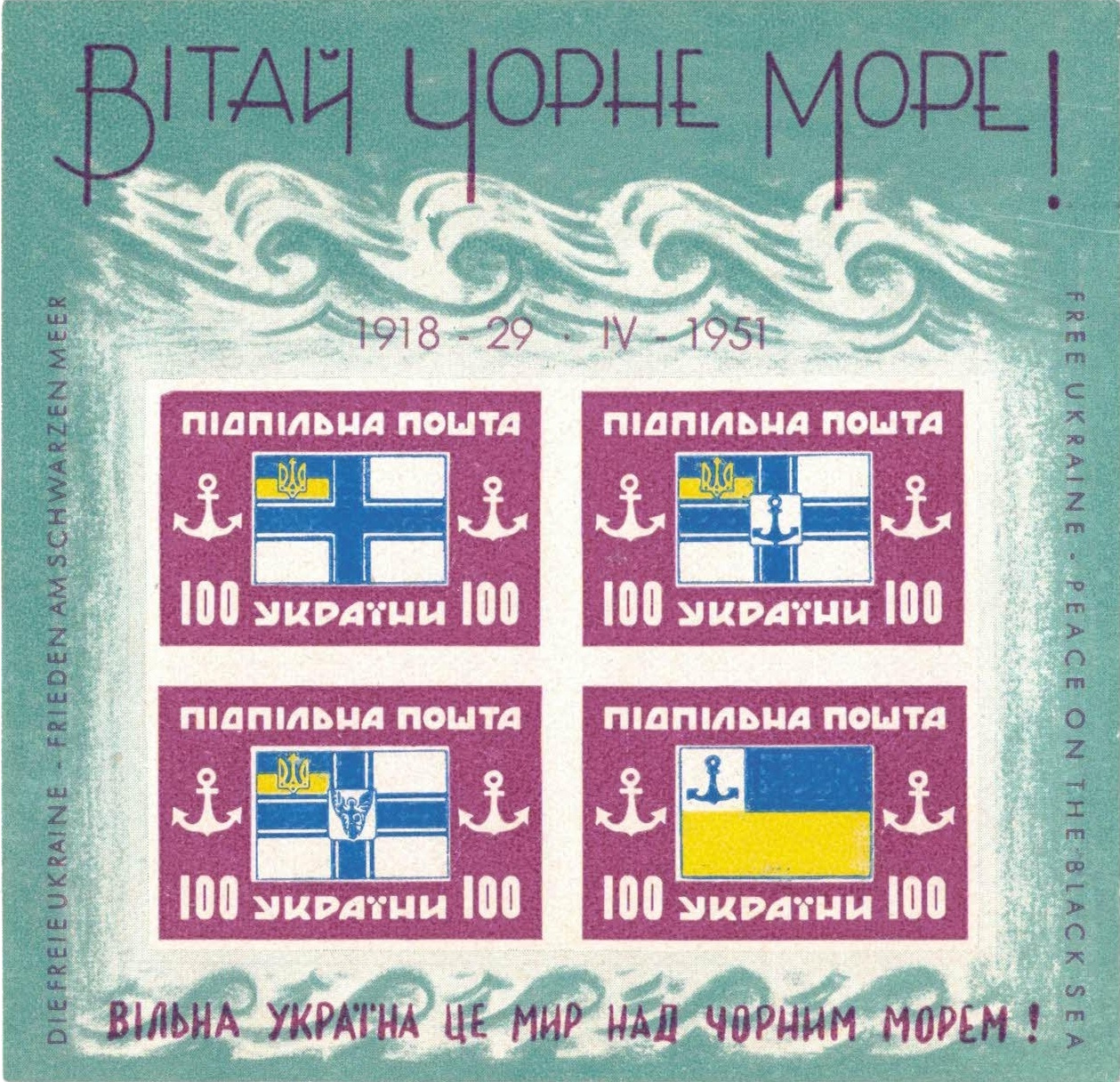
Commemorative souvenir sheet of the Ukrainian People's Republic from the Ukrainian Underground Post
