= London 2010 International Stamp Exhibition =

International postage stamp exhibition

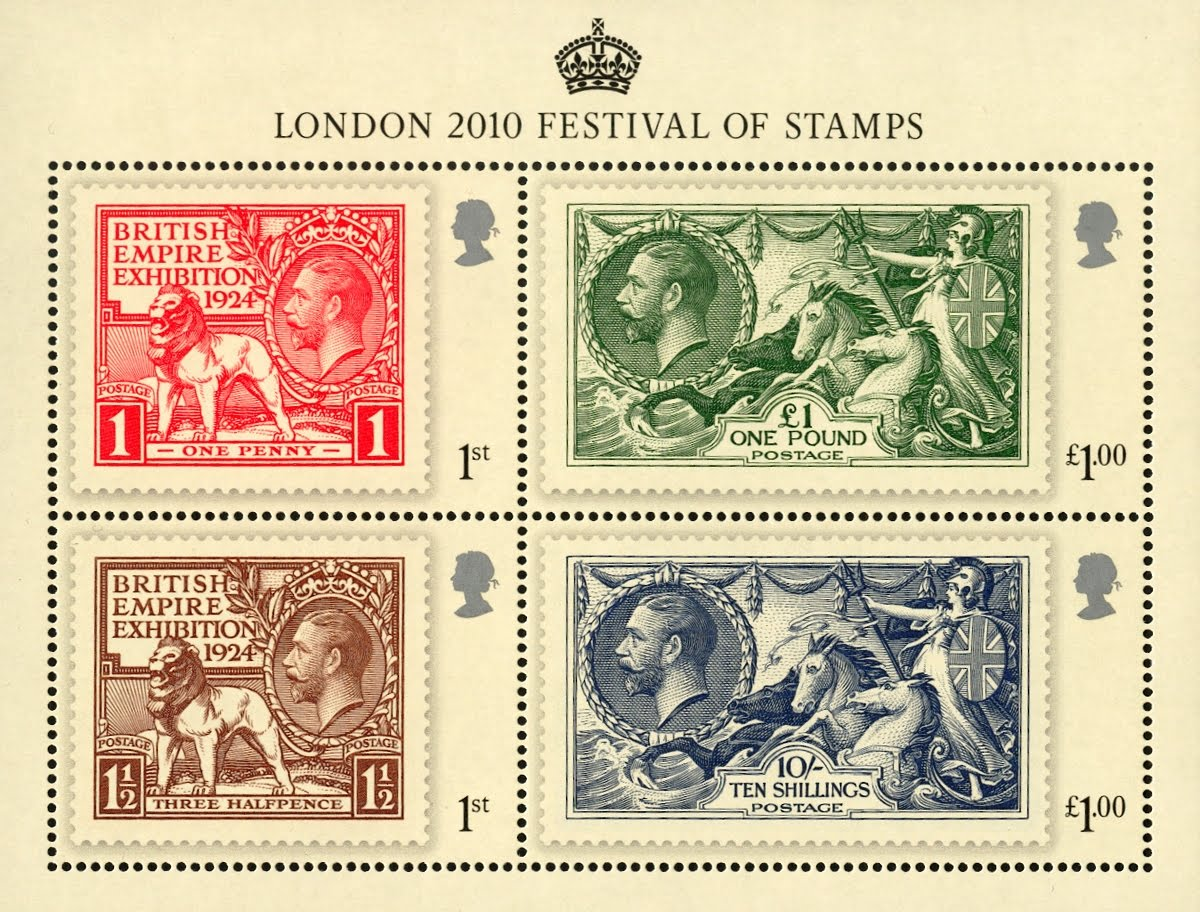
The British Post Office miniature sheet issued in 2010 to promote the exhibition.

The London 2010 International Stamp Exhibition, 8–15 May 2010 at the Business Design Centre in Islington, London, was a major international stamp exhibition that was granted FIP (Fédération Internationale de Philatélie) patronage.

== Theme ==
The show was part of the year-long London 2010 Festival of Stamps to mark the centenary of the accession of King George V, the philatelist king.

== Controversy ==
The choice of the Business Design Centre as the venue has been controversial as it has been criticised as too small and in a poor location. Attempts by David Springbett and others to develop an alternative exhibition based at the ExCeL Exhibition Centre in East London were abandoned when the FIP granted the London 2010 show patronage.

== Competition classes ==
The exhibition was the first to change the competitive displays halfway through and featured the following classes:

First four days:

- Traditional philately
- Revenues
- Postal stationery
- One-frame displays with a link to George V

Second four days:

- Aerophilately
- Postal history
- Thematic philately
- Youth philately

Philatelic literature was also shown.

By changing the display frames halfway through, over 2400 frames of material were shown.

== Palmares ==
The Grand Prix d'Exposition went to Alan Holyoake for ‘The First Line Engraved Postage Stamps‘ (98 points).

The Best in Class awards went to the following exhibits:

- Traditional Class: Yo-Chi Kim (South Korea) for Great Joseon and Daeha Empire (1884-1909) (96 points)
- Postal History Class: Steven Walske (United States) for Heart of the West: San Francisco as a Postal Hub from 1849 to 1869 (98 points)
- Postal Stationery Class: Alan Holyoake (United Kingdom) for The Introduction and Usage of the Mulready Envelope and Letter Sheet Stationery (98 points)
- Revenue Class: Jukka Mäkinen (Finland) for Sweden, the First Revenue Stamp Issue of 1811-1844 (95 points)
- One Frame Class: Pradip Jain (India) for The Development of the Airmail Route Cairo-India 1918-1929 (94 points)
- Aerophilately Class: Peter Motson (United Kingdom) for Newfoundland Airmail Stamps & Airmail Flights: 1919-1948 (97 points)
- Thematic Philately Class: Joshua Magier (Israel) for Land Cultivation from the Beginning of Agriculture to the Present Time (97 points)
- Youth Class: Livie-Laure Tillard (Canada) for La Marianne de Briat surchargée St-Pierre et Miquelon (84 points)
- Literature Class: Ulrich Ferchenbauer (Austria) for Österreich 1850-1918 Spezial Katalog (96 points)

== See also ==
- London 2010 Festival of Stamps
