= Karbovanets =

Former currency of Ukraine

український карбованець (Ukrainian)
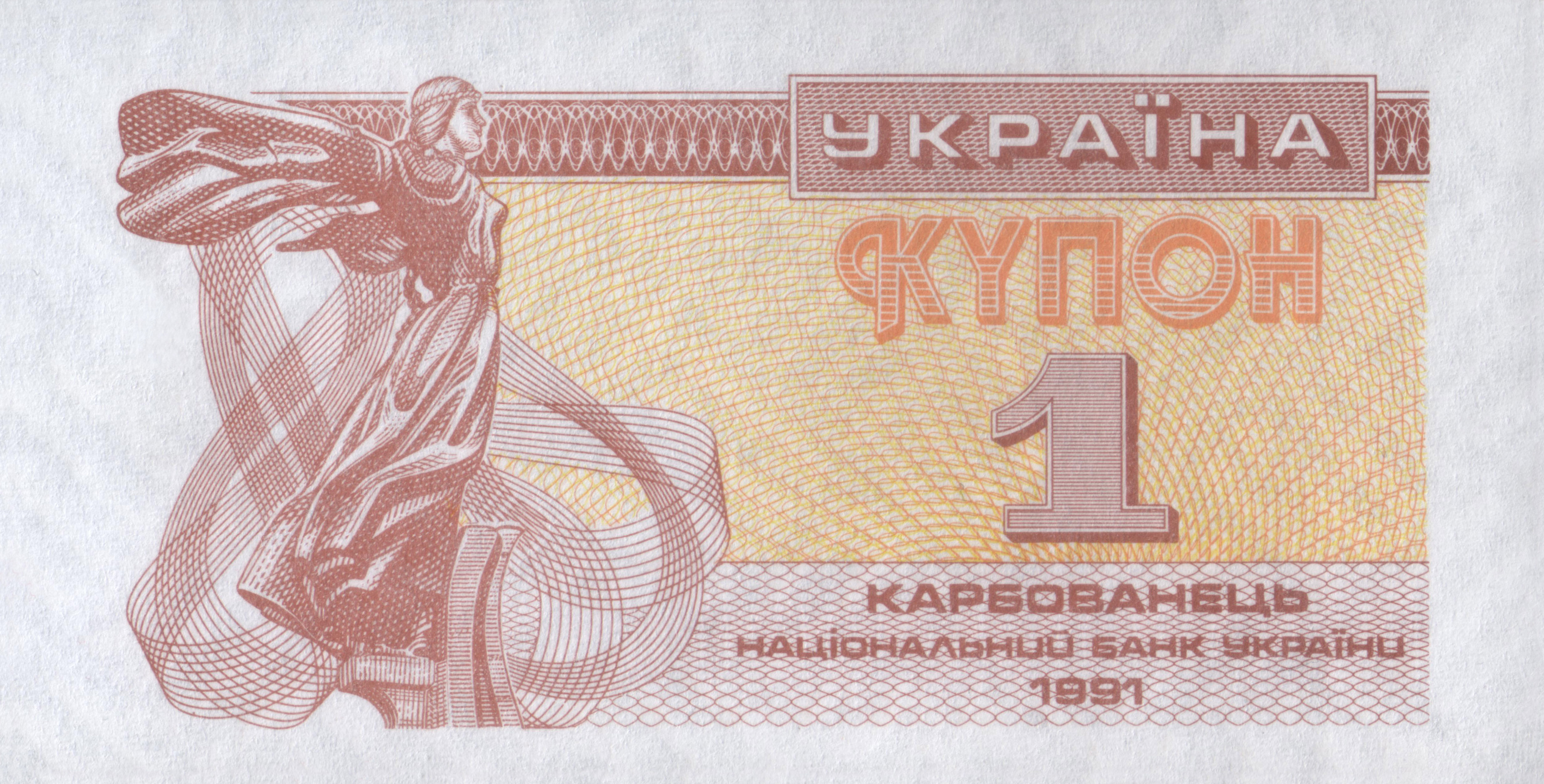
1 karbovanets
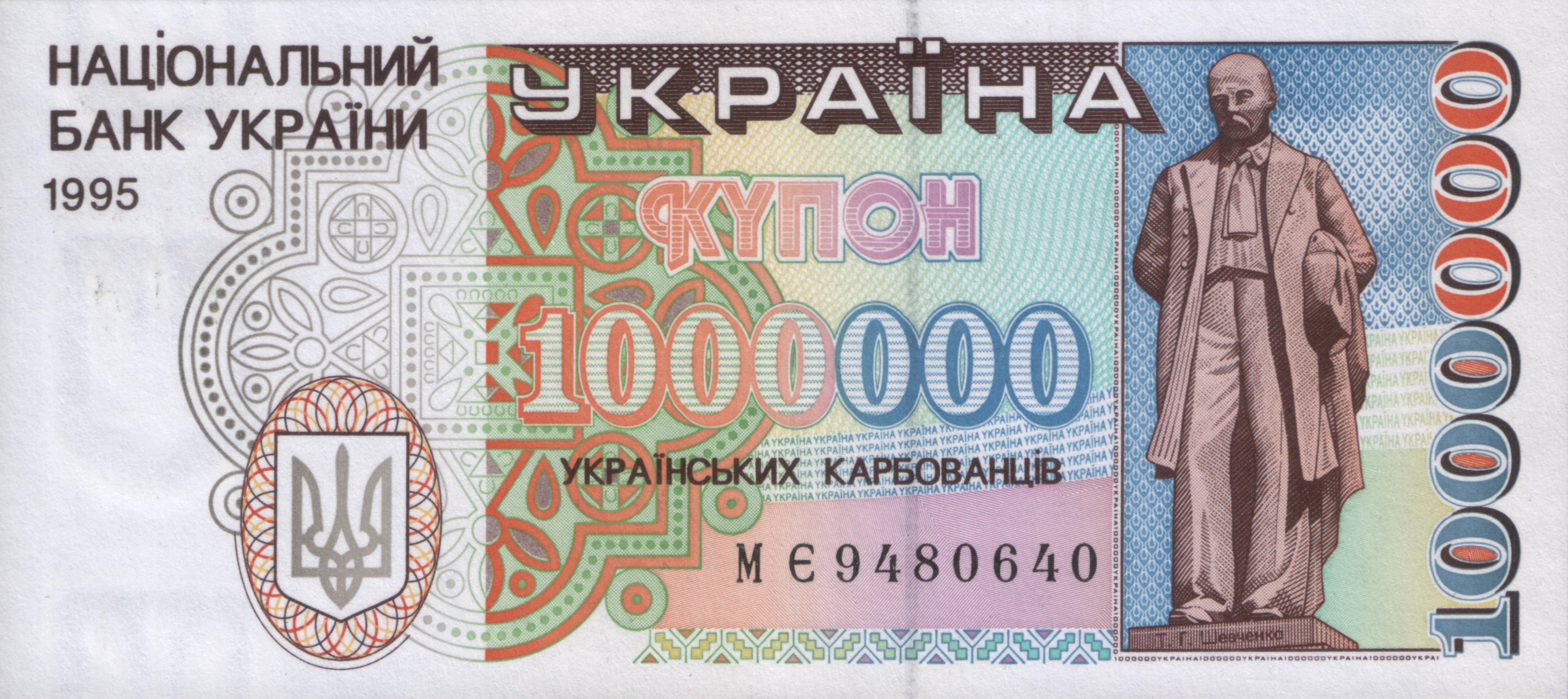
1,000,000 karbovantsiv

ISO 4217
- Code: UAK

Unit
- Plural: karbovantsi (nom. pl.), karbovantsiv (gen. pl.)

Denominations
- Subunit
- 1/100: kopiyka (копійка)
- Plural
- kopiyka (копійка): kopiyky (nom. pl.), kopiyok (gen. pl.)
- Banknotes: 1, 3, 5, 10, 25, 50, 100, 200, 500, 1000, 2000, 5000, 10,000, 20,000, 50,000, 100,000, 200,000, 500,000, 1,000,000 karbovantsiv

Demographics
- User(s): Ukrainian People's Republic (1st) (Ukraine) Ukrainian State (2nd) (Nazi Germany) Reichskommissariat Ukraine (3rd); Ukraine (4th)

Issuance
- Central bank: National Bank of Ukraine
- Website: www.bank.gov.ua
- This infobox shows the latest status before this currency was rendered obsolete.

The Karbovanets (Ukrainian: карбованець, romanized: karbovanets', plural: карбованці, karbovantsi for 2–4, or карбованців, karbovantsiv for 5 or more), also colloquially known as kupon (купон, plural: купони, kupony) or coupon from the banknote printing, is a former unit of currency in Ukraine in four separate periods of the 20th century. It is also a predecessor currency of today's Ukrainian hryvnia. The karbovanets was subdivided into one hundred kopiykas, but no denominations in kopiykas were ever issued, owing to inflation.

In the ISO 4217 standard, the official name is listed as either misspelled as karbovanet or correctly spelled as karbovanets likewise to the English version of the National Bank of Ukraine's website refers to it as Karbovanets. The ISO 4217 standard code for the currency is UAK.

== History ==
=== First karbovanets (1917–1920) ===
==== Ukrainian Central Rada (1917–1918) ====
In March 1917 in Kyiv, some political parties formed the Central Rada, which proclaimed on 20 November 1917, the foundation of the Ukrainian People's Republic. On 19 December of the same year, a temporary law about the issue of state banknotes by the UPR was adopted. According to this law: "Banknotes must be issued in karbovanets" (Ukrainian: карбованець). Each karbovanets contained 17.424 parts of pure gold and was divided into two hryvnias (Ukrainian: гривня) or 200 shahs (Ukrainian: шаг).

The etymology of the name "karbovanets" is debatable: by one supposition, it originated in Ukraine from the ancient primitive way to carve (karbuvaty, Ukrainian: карбувати) numbers of calculations on a rod, and by another supposition, from the carving (incision) on a rim of a metal rouble.

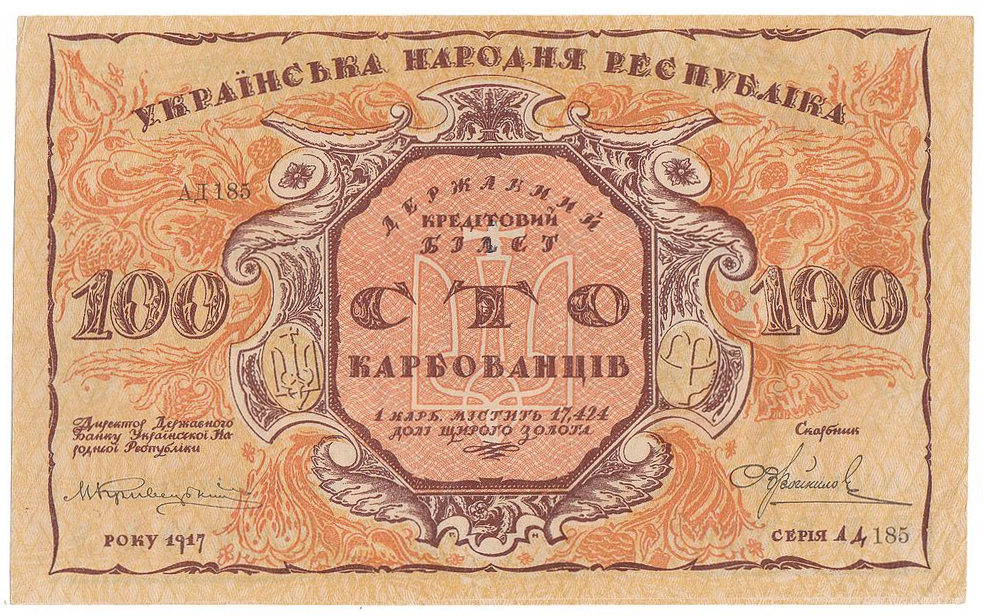

On 5 January 1918, the first Ukrainian banknote with a value of 100 karbovantsiv was issued. The trident depicted on the banknote was proclaimed as a National Emblem of the UPR on 25 February 1918. On all of the issued banknotes, it stated only one series, "AД" and only one number, 185.

On 20 September 1918, the Central Rada proclaimed the issue of banknotes of the State Treasure in denominations of 5, 10, 25, and 50 karbovantsiv to be valid until 1 March 1924. On 6 April, the 25-karbovantsiv banknotes and 50 karbovantsiv banknotes later appeared, but the 5- and 10-karbovantsiv banknotes were not released. This series of banknotes was issued without designation of series and number. In subsequent issues, the series indicated the place of printing: AK (Kyiv) and AO (Odesa). After the occupation of Odesa by military units of Denikin's Army in 1919, the printing house of Odesa continued printing banknotes of 50 karbovantsiv. The Ukrainian Government proclaimed money issued by the Denikinists to be false (series AO, numbers 210 and above).

In 1920, the Government of Ukraine printed some dozens of millions of banknotes for temporary use by the Revolutionary Committee in Western Ukraine. This issue of series AO had numbers from 236 to 250. The next release by the Central Rada (Parliament of Ukraine) was issued on 19 April 1918 and included denominations of 10, 20, 30, 40, and 50 shahs. The term "shah" is borrowed by the Central Rada from the ancient name of small coins (change) from as long ago as the 16th century. Shahs were printed in Kyiv in sheets of 100, perforated in order to simplify tearing off separate banknotes. Shahs were in circulation until March 1919, when they were abolished by the Soviets. There are many existing banknotes of this value.

==== Ukrainian State Government (1918) ====
The Congress of Free Husbandmen on 29 April 1918 (with the great support of Austro-German occupants), elected tsarist general Pavlo Skoropadskyi as Hetman of Ukraine. He proclaimed the overthrow of the Central Rada government and the foundation of the Ukrainian State.

In Skoropadskyi's time, the so-called "paper hryvnias" were introduced in commerce, though the Karbovanets were also used in the Ukrainian State as the official currency. The Paper Hryvnias were ordered by the Central Rada from Germany.

On 5 August 1918, the first banknote that appeared in commerce was the 3.6% state bond with the name "Bank-note of the State Treasure". State bonds were printed with eight coupons, four coupons on each side.

On 17 October 1918, the Hetman's government received from Germany another supply of banknotes with values of 2, 10, and 100 hryvnias, as ordered by the Central Rada. A bit later, banknotes of 1000 and 2000 hryvnias were received. They bore the abbreviation of the Ukrainian State (УД, Ukrainian: Українська Держава), the official name of Ukraine during the Hetman's time. These hryvnias were issued on 17 October 1918, 59 days before the Hetman's overthrow.

==== Ukrainian Directorate (1918–1920) ====
The defeat of Germany and Austria-Hungary in World War I also resulted in the breakup of Ukraine's occupation regime (Hetman Skoropadsky's government). On the night of 14 November 1918 in Bila Tserkva, the government of the Ukrainian Directorate was formed. Within a month, military forces of the Directorate occupied Kyiv. On 16 January 1919, the Government of the Directorate declared war on Soviet Russia. This action required issuing enormous sums of money. In Kyiv, the Directorate used reserves of banknotes which were issued previously by the Central Rada's governments.

The military campaign of the Directorate turned out to be unsuccessful, and the offensive of the Red Army forced the Directorate to leave Kyiv and to settle in Vinnytsia (5 February 1919). There, the Directorate used 3.6% state bonds for their purchasing power. Beginning in March 1919, a series of banknotes (5 hryvnias) was issued. 5-hryvnia banknotes were printed on grey paper and contained an error in their text: гривна instead of гривень. Some of the banknotes entered circulation. The next bastion for the embattled Directorate was Kamanets-Podilsk, where it held out for almost a year and issued a few more banknotes.

In August 1919, banknotes were printed with the value of 100, 250, and 1000 karbovantsiv. The 1000 karbovantsiv banknote was issued in Kyiv and entered circulation on 13 November 1918. Printing was continued by the Directorate government in October 1919 at Kam'yanets'-Podil's'kyi and in 1920 at Warsaw. Later, 10 karbovantsiv (August 1919) and 25 karbovantsiv (October 1919) were put into use. The design of the 10 karbovantsiv (tank notes) was prepared in the Hetman's period, and their obverse had the large letters УД which designated the Ukrainian state (Ukrainian: Українська Держава). The last banknotes of the Directorate were prepared in Austria. The series contained banknotes of 50 and 1000 hryvnias. But they were never issued (only some specimen copies are known). On 20 November 1920, the Directorial Government was disbanded by S.V. Petlyura's edict, and its provision of currency ended.

==== Ukrainian SSR (1919–1920) ====
At the beginning of 1919 in Kharkiv, by Lenin's direction, Russia financed the pro-Soviet government. However, a period of unprecedented inflation was triggered by the Civil War and resulted in a sharp deficit of circulating money, especially banknotes. The People's Commissar of Finance of the USSR, with the consent of the RSFSR government, decided to use the 10 karbovanets banknotes of the Directorate. This note's artwork (without series and numbers) was captured by the Red Army on 5 February 1919 during the takeover of Kyiv from the Petlyurian troops. The Soviet banknote differed from the Directorate's in paper, ink, watermarks, and the location of their series and numbers.

One more banknote of 50 karbovantsiv with Soviet symbols was printed. On 1 June 1919, Ukraine united with the Soviet governments of Russia, Lithuania, Latvia, and Belarus in a common front, and only one monetary unit was legitimized – the ruble of the USSR. The 50-karbovantsiv banknote is known only by some specimen copies.

=== Third karbovanets (1942–1945) ===
During the Nazi occupation of Ukraine in World War II, the German occupying government (Reichskommissariat Ukraine) issued banknotes denominated in karbovanets (Karbowanez in German). The karbovanets replaced the Soviet ruble at par and was in circulation between 1942 and 1945. It was pegged to the Reichsmark at a rate of 10 karbovantsiv = 1 Reichsmark.

=== Fourth karbovanets (1992–1996) ===
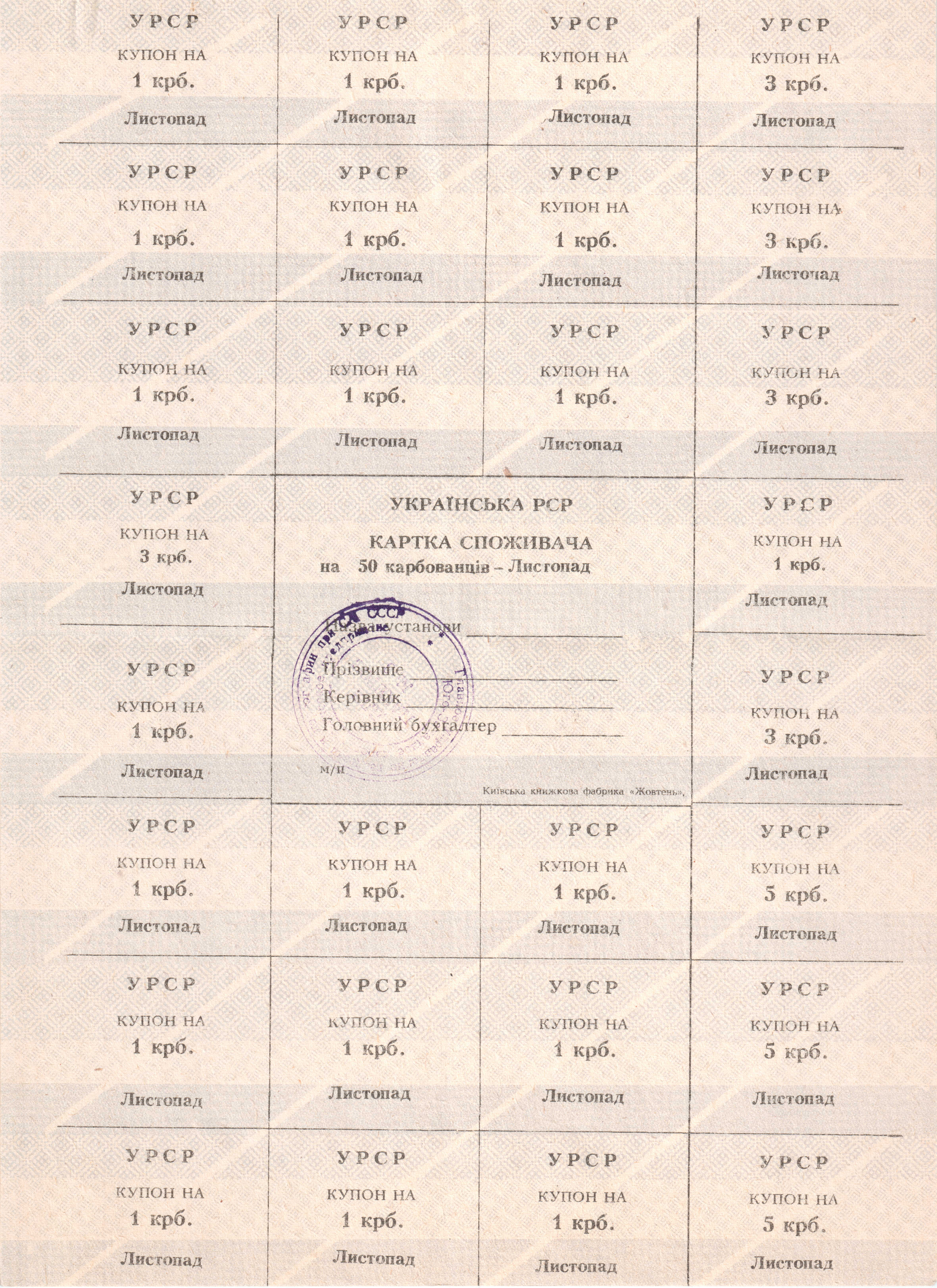
Single-use coupons issued in 1991

In November 1990, with the collapse of the Soviet command economy, the Ukrainian SSR introduced one-time coupons, which were distributed to Ukrainian residents. The coupons were created in addition to rubles in order to buy groceries and living essentials. On 10 January 1992, the karbovanets replaced the ruble at par, with the ISO 4217 code being UAK.

The karbovanets, which suffered from hyperinflation, was replaced by the hryvnia in 1996, at a rate of 100,000 karbovantsiv to 1 hryvnia. The hryvnia was introduced in 1996, and from 2 September until 16 September both the karbovanets and hryvnia were in circulation. After 16 September 1996, the use of the karbovanets as a national currency was discontinued.

== Banknotes ==
=== First Karbovanets ===
In 1917, the Central Rada of the Ukrainian People's Republic introduced 100 karbovantsiv notes. These were followed in 1918 by State Treasury notes for 25 and 50 karbovantsiv. That year also saw the issue of postage stamp currency denominated in shah and various bonds, together with state credit notes in denominations of 2, 10, 100, 500, 1,000, and 2,000 hryven. The Directorate issued notes for 100, 250 and 100 karbovanets in 1918, followed by 10 and 25 karbovanets in 1919. State notes for 5, 50, and 1,000 hryven were issued in 1920. 1 Karbovanet was worth 2 hryvni or 200 shah.

1918 series
Picture		Face value	Value in			Years of printing
Obverse	Reverse	Face value	Karbovanets	Hryvnia	Shah	Years of printing
Banknotes denominated in shah
		10 shah	0.05	0.1	10	1918
		20 shah	0.1	0.2	20	1918
		30 shah	0.15	0.3	30	1918
		40 shah	0.2	0.4	40	1918
		50 shah	0.25	0.5	50	1918
		90 shah	0.45	0.9	90	1918
		1 hryvnia 80 shah	0.9	1.8	180	1918
		3 hryvni 60 shah	1.8	3.6	360	1918
Banknotes denominated in hryvnia
		2 hryvni	1	2	200	1918
		10 hryven	5	10	1000	1918
		50 hryven	25	50	5000	1918
		50 hryven	25	50	5000	1920
		100 hryven	50	100	10 000	1918
		200 hryven	100	200	20 000	1918
		500 hryven	250	500	50 000	1918
		1000 hryven	500	1000	100 000	1918
		1000 hryven	500	1000	100 000	1920
		2000 hryven	1000	2000	200 000	1918
Banknotes denominated in karbovanets
		10 karbovanets	10	20	2000	1919
		25 karbovanets	25	50	5000	1918
		25 karbovanets	25	50	5000	1919
		50 karbovanets	50	100	10 000	1918–1920
		100 karbovanets	100	200	20 000	1917
		100 karbovanets	100	200	20 000	1918
		250 karbovanets	250	500	50 000	1918
		1000 karbovanets	1000	2000	200 000	1918

=== Second karbovanets ===
Banknotes were introduced in June 1942 in denominations of 1, 2, 5, 10, 20, 50, 100, 200, and 500 karbovantsiv (called Karbowanez in German). The banknotes were in dark colour, carrying nearly all inscriptions in German and a warning in both German and Ukrainian stating "falsification of banknotes is punished by imprisoning". The obverse of the notes all featured a portrait, including children, a peasant, a miner, a seaman, and a chemist. The Nazi Reichsadler also appeared.

1941–1944 Series
Image		Value	Main colour
Obverse	Reverse	Value	Main colour
		1	brown
		2	brown
		5	brown
		10	brown
		20	brown
		50	brown
		100	brown
		200	brown
		500	brown

=== Third karbovanets ===
In 1991, notes were introduced in denominations of 1, 3, 5, 10, 25, 50, and 100 karbovantsiv (also called kupons or coupons). All 1991 banknotes were of the same design, picturing Lybid from the monument of the founders of Kyiv on the obverse and the Sophia Cathedral on the reverse. The banknotes did not carry individual serial numbers or signatures. In 1992, banknotes for 100, 200, 500, and 1,000 karbovantsiv were issued, which carried serial numbers.

First Series
Image		Value	Main colour	Description		Date of	
Obverse	Reverse	Value	Main colour	Obverse	Reverse	first printing	issue
		1	brown	Lybid	Kyiv Pechersk Lavra	1991	1991
		3	green	Lybid	Kyiv Pechersk Lavra	1991	1991
		5	blue	Lybid	Kyiv Pechersk Lavra	1991	1991
		10	pink	Lybid	Kyiv Pechersk Lavra	1991	1991
		25	purple	Lybid	Kyiv Pechersk Lavra	1991	1991
		50	green	Lybid	Kyiv Pechersk Lavra	1991	1991
		100	brown	Lybid	Kyiv Pechersk Lavra	1991	1991

In 1993, banknotes for 2000 and 5000 karbovantsiv were issued. Having similar designs as the 1992 banknotes, they were the first to carry the coat of arms of Ukraine. In the same year, notes for 10,000, 20,000, 50,000, and 100,000 karbovantsiv were also introduced into circulation, which were bigger in size and pictured the Volodymyr Monument on the obverse and the Kyiv Opera on the reverse. Subsequently, banknotes for 200,000 and 500,000 karbovantsiv were introduced in 1994, followed by the 1,000,000 karbovantsiv banknote in 1995, which pictured the Taras Shevchenko Monument in Kyiv.

Second Series
Image		Value	Main colour	Description		Date of	
Obverse	Reverse	Value	Main colour	Obverse	Reverse	first printing	issue
		100	orange	Kyi, Shchek and Khoryv	Kyiv Pechersk Lavra	1992	1992
		200	brown	Kyi, Shchek and Khoryv	Kyiv Pechersk Lavra	1992	1992
		500	cyan	Kyi, Shchek and Khoryv	Kyiv Pechersk Lavra	1992	1992
		1,000	red	Kyi, Shchek and Khoryv	Kyiv Pechersk Lavra	1992	1992
		2,000	blue	Kyi, Shchek and Khoryv	Kyiv Pechersk Lavra	1993	1993
		5,000	red	Kyi, Shchek and Khoryv	Kyiv Pechersk Lavra	1993	1993
		10,000	green	Volodymyrska Hill	National Bank of Ukraine headquarters	1993	1993
		20,000	purple	Volodymyrska Hill	National Bank of Ukraine headquarters	1993	1993
		50,000	light orange	Volodymyrska Hill	National Bank of Ukraine headquarters	1993	1993
		100,000	grey	Volodymyrska Hill	National Bank of Ukraine headquarters	1993	1993
		200,000	brown	Volodymyrska Hill	National Opera of Ukraine	1994	1994
		500,000	blue	Volodymyrska Hill	National Opera of Ukraine	1994	1994
		1,000,000	brown	Taras Shevchenko	Red University Building	1995	1995

=== Commemorative and anniversary coins ===
Between 1995 and 1996, the National Bank of Ukraine issued commemorative and jubilee coins as proofs with a denomination of: 200,000 karbovantsiv (12 types, made of cupronickel); 1,000,000 karbovantsiv (4 types, made of silver); 2,000,000 karbovantsiv (5 types, made of silver). Coins were dedicated to the events of the historical past and modern life on various topics: history, religion, sports, culture, etc.

== See also ==
- Ukrainian hryvnia, the national currency of Ukraine since 1996
- Ukrainian shah, historical currency of Ukraine
- Economy of Ukraine

Preceded by: Russian ruble Reason: independence	Currency of Ukrainian People's Republic; 19 December 1917 – 1 March 1918	Succeeded by: Ukrainian hryvnia

Preceded by: Ukrainian hryvnia Reason: coup d'état (on April 29, 1918)	Currency of Ukrainian State; April 1918 – December 1918	Succeeded by: Ukrainian hryvnia Reason: coup d'état (on December 14, 1918)

Ukrainian karbovanets
Preceded by: Ukrainian hryvnia Reason: Soviet occupation (November 1920)	Currency of Ukrainian SSR; 1920 – 1942	Succeeded by: Second (Nazi) karbovanets Reason: Nazi occupation (1941)
Preceded by: Second (Nazi) karbovanets Reason: Soviet occupation (1944)	Currency of Ukrainian SSR; 1945 – 1992	Succeeded by: Third Ukrainian karbovanets Reason: Independence (on August 24, 1991)

Second (Nazi) karbovanets
Preceded by: Ukrainian karbovanets Reason: Nazi occupation (1941)	Currency of Reichskommissariat Ukraine; 1942 – 1945	Succeeded by: Ukrainian karbovanets Reason: Soviet occupation (1944)

Third karbovanets
Preceded by: Ukrainian karbovanets Reason: Independence (on August 24, 1991)	Currency of Ukraine; 1992 – 1996	Succeeded by: Ukrainian hryvnia Reason: inflation (on September 2, 1996); Ratio: 1 hryvnia = 100,000 karbovantsiv
