= Postage stamps and postal history of Ukraine =

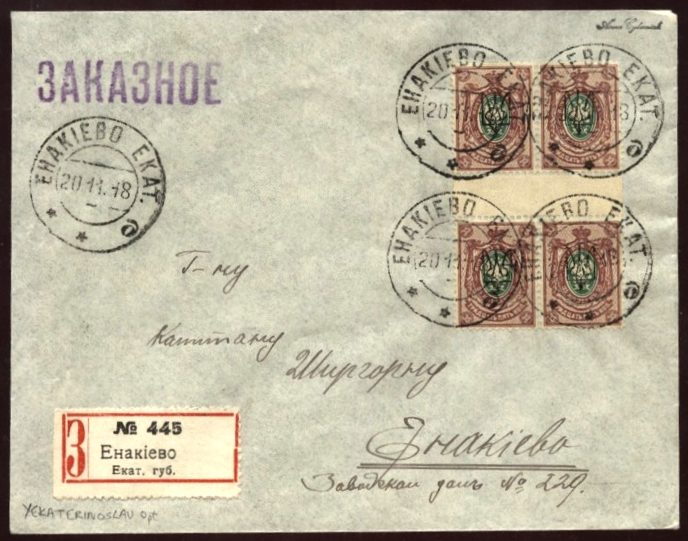
A 1918 cover bearing Russian stamps overprinted with a Ukrainian trident

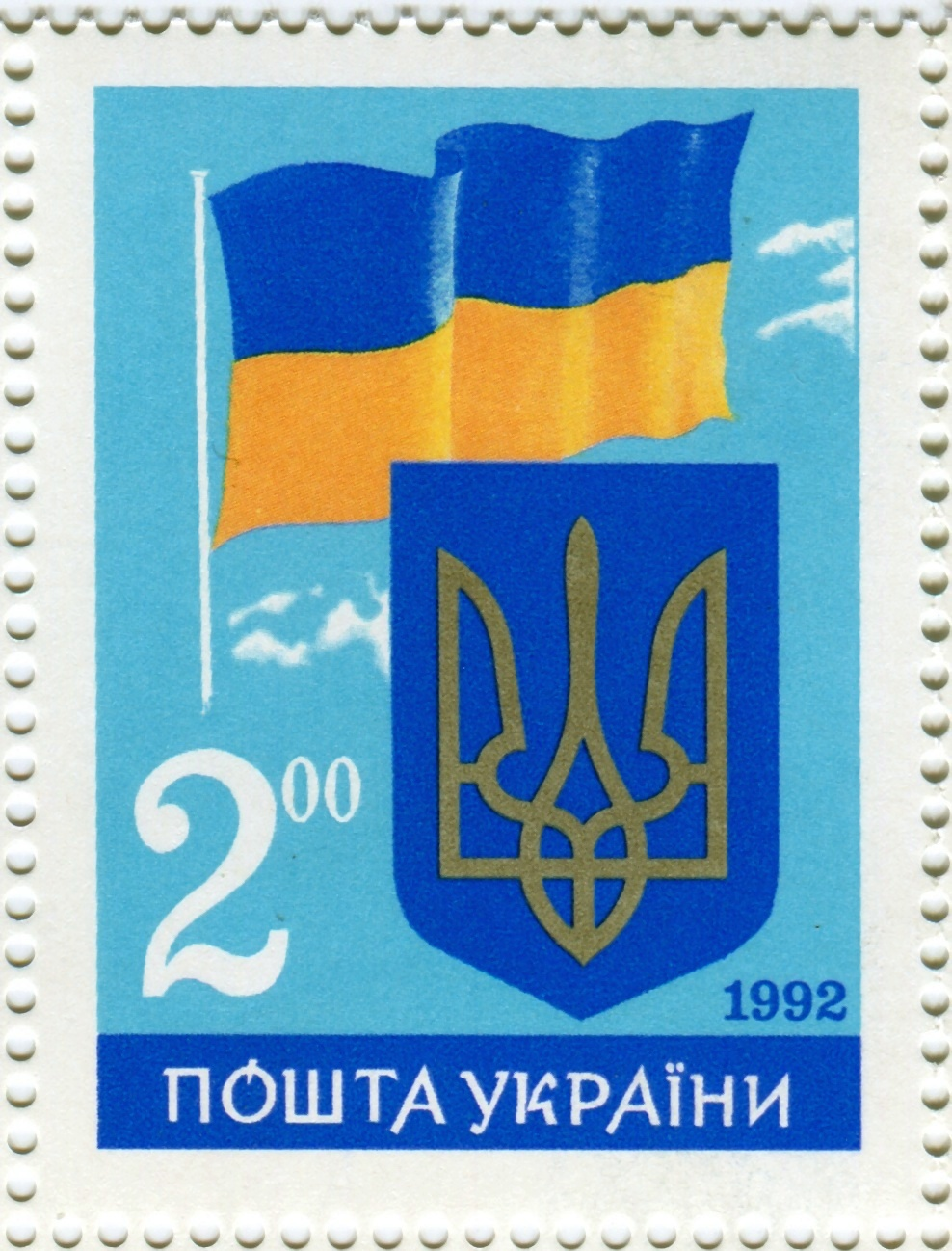
A modern stamp of Ukraine, showing the Ukrainian trident and flag

This is a survey of the postage stamps and postal history of Ukraine.

Ukraine is a republic in Eastern Europe. It is bordered by the Russian Federation to the east; Belarus to the north; Poland, Slovakia, and Hungary to the west; Romania and Moldova to the southwest; and the Black Sea and Sea of Azov to the south. After decades of Soviet occupation, Ukraine re-established its independence in 1991. The city of Kyiv is both the capital and the largest city of Ukraine.

== Zemstvo stamps ==
Around 800 Russian Zemstvo stamps were issued in Ukraine between 1866 and 1917 at 39 locations. The first stamps were issued at Verkhnodniprovsk, Katerynoslav Guberniya, and in Dniprovsk, Tauridia Gubernia - both of which are now located in Dnipropetrovsk Oblast.

== Ukrainian People's Republic ==
In 1918 an independent Ukrainian People's Republic was established and a series of five definitive stamps were issued. They were printed imperforate on thin paper and then on thicker paper with perforations. The 10 and 20-shah stamps were designed by the artist Anton Sereda and the 30, 40, and 50-shah stamps by Heorhiy Narbut, a master graphic artist and president of the Ukrainian Academy of Arts in Kyiv.

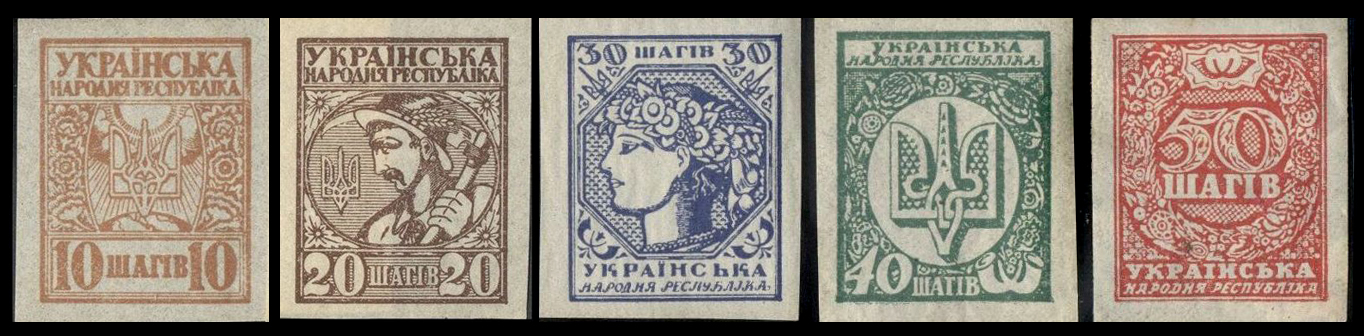
This 1918 issue of shahs was designed by graphic artists Anton Sereda and Heorhiy Narbut.

=== The 1921 non-issued series (Vienna issue) ===
Fourteen original designs are very common.

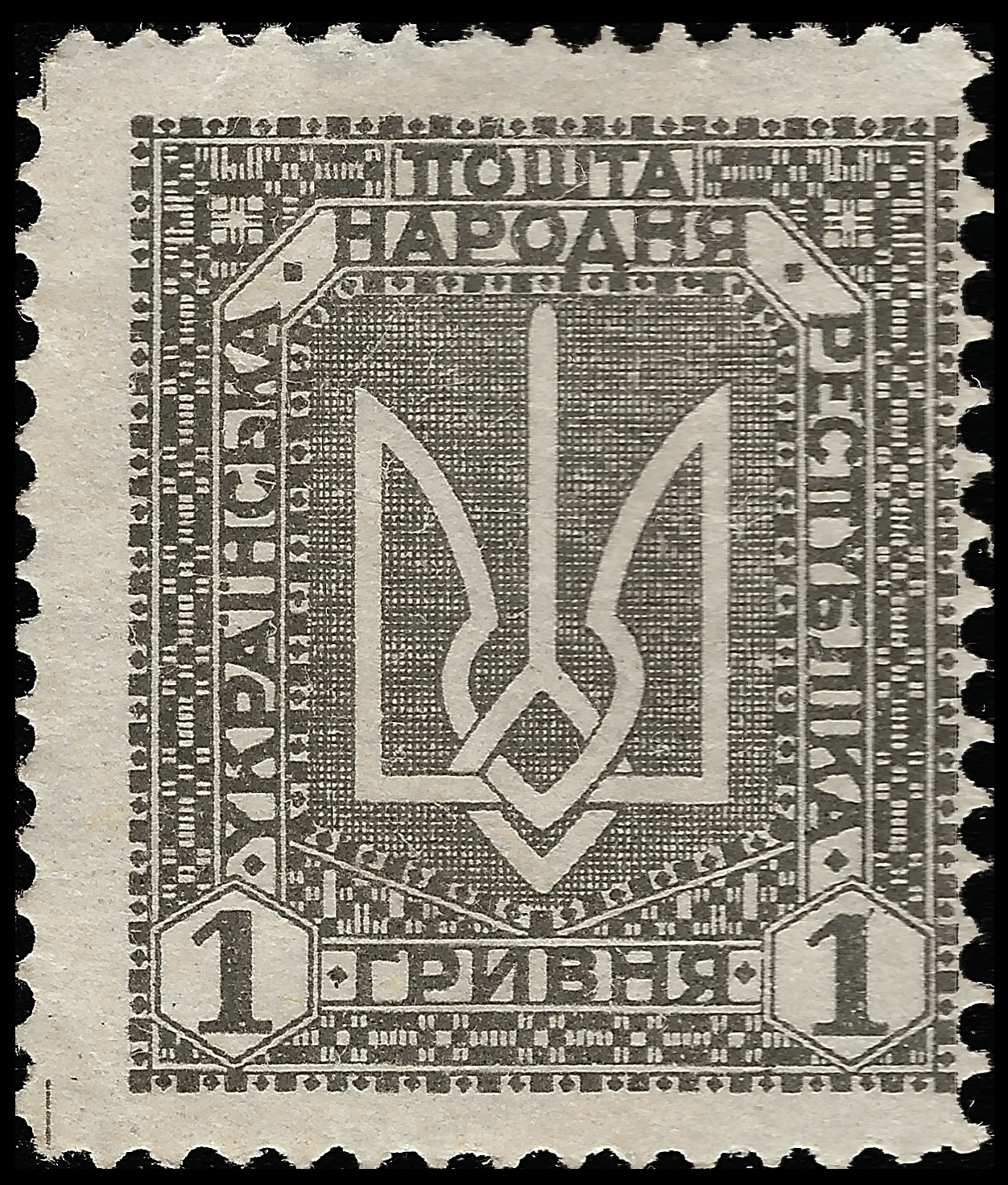
Postage stamp of the Ukrainian People's Republic, 1920. 1 Hr face value.

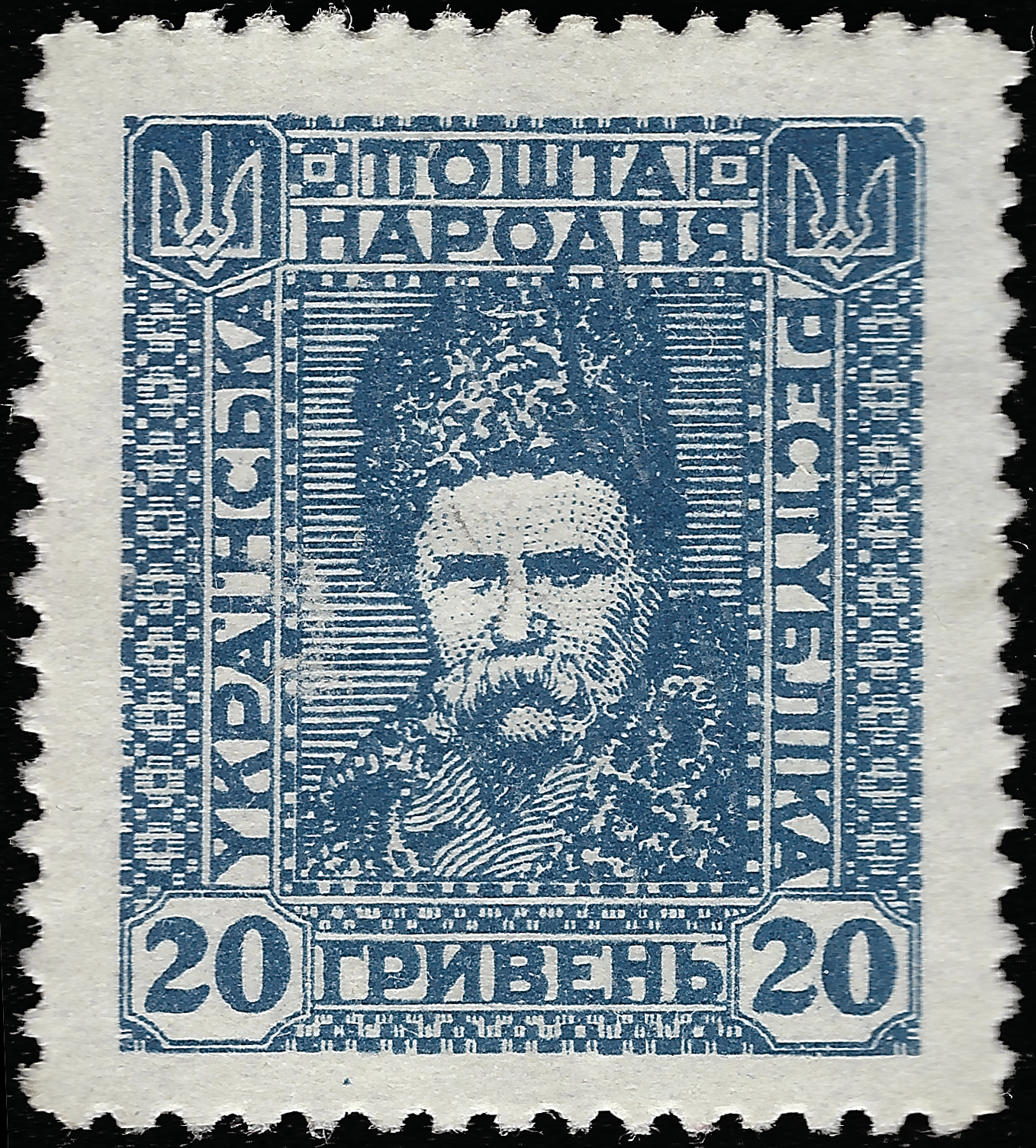
Postage stamp of the Ukrainian People's Republic, 1920. 20 Hr face value.

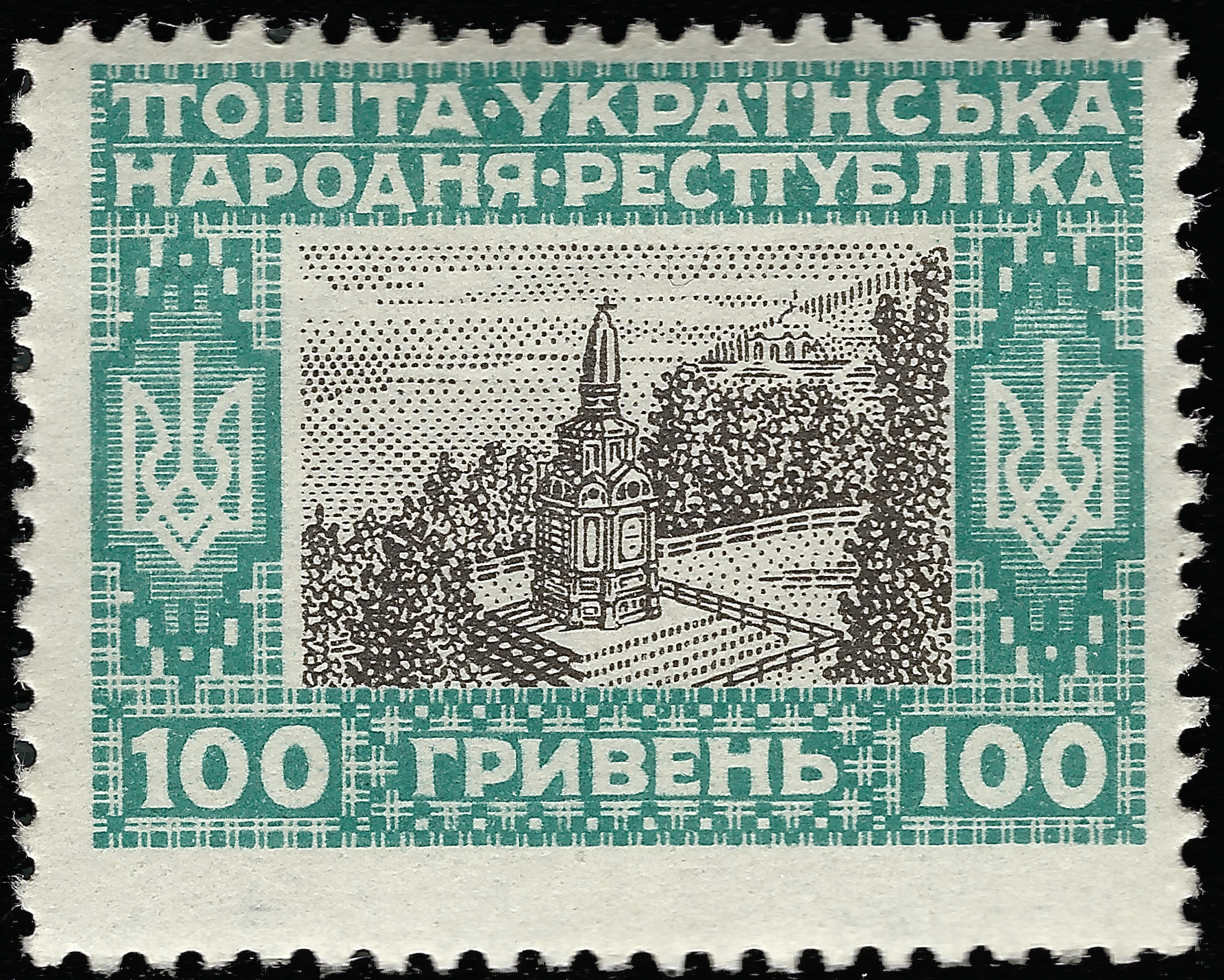
Postage stamp of the Ukrainian People's Republic, 1920. 100 Hr face value.

== Trident series ==
In 1918 Russian stamps were overprinted with a trident for use in Kyiv, Odessa, Yekaterinoslav, Kharkiv, Poltava, Podolia, and Kherson. There are hundreds of different stamps with many varieties of overprint. The stamps have been widely forged.

== West Ukrainian National Republic ==
In 1918 and 1919 Eastern Galicia had internal autonomy as the West Ukrainian National Republic. Stamps of Austria were overprinted for use in the region.

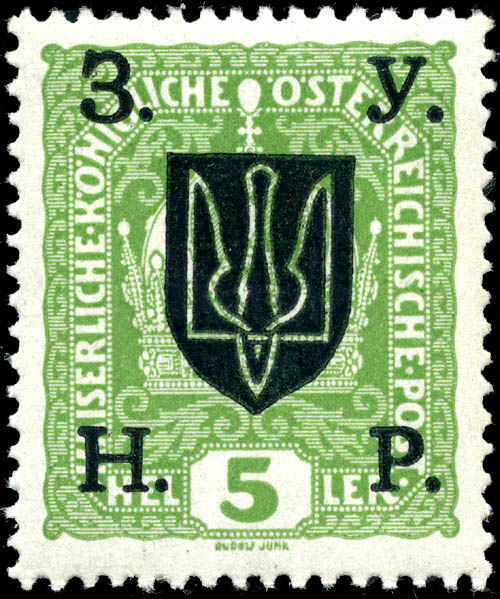
An Austrian stamp overprinted in 1919 for use in the West Ukrainian National Republic

== Soviet republic ==
A Ukrainian Soviet republic was declared on 14 March 1919 and a set of stamps were issued for famine relief in 1923. Ukraine used the stamps of the Soviet Union thereafter until the end of 1991, apart from during World War II.

Stamps issued for famine relief in 1923

== Carpatho-Ukraine ==
Carpatho-Ukraine was an autonomous region within Czecho-Slovakia from late 1938 to March 15, 1939.

== World War II ==
During the Second World War Ukraine was occupied by Germany. German stamps were used between 14 November 1941 and 1943 overprinted UKRAINE in small letters. After liberation, Soviet stamps were used once again.

== Ukrainian exile ==
The Ukrainian Underground Post (Ukrainian: Підпільна пошта України, converted in Ukrainian Latin alphabet to Pidpilna Poshta Ukrainy (abbeviation: PPU)) was an unrecognized postal agency that was founded by Ukrainian exiles in 1949 and headquartered in Munich, West Germany. From its opening in 1949 until its closure in 1983, it issued various postal stamps under the Organisation of Ukrainian Nationalists (OUN) featuring Ukrainian events, individuals, and organisations, advocating for a sovereign Ukrainian state. The government of the Ukrainian People's Republic in exile also issued its own postal stamps from 1948 to 1972.

== Independent Ukraine ==
On July 16, 1990 the Supreme Soviet of the Ukrainian SSR adopted the Declaration of State Sovereignty of Ukraine. Kyiv artist Alexander Ivachnenko received from the Ministry of Communications of the USSR order for a stamp dedicated to the event. He offered some sketches that were discussed in the Ministry of Communications of the USSR and the Supreme Council of the Republic. On one of the first choices a girl symbolizing Ukraine, was dressed in a shirt, tunic and barefoot. She suggested, "shod" in boots and red skirt instead of "put" Plahty. In the wreath a blue ribbon was added, causing the blue background of the brand changed to gold. The inscription on the stamp was "Mail of the USSR", but in the preparation of drawings for the press, it was changed to the traditional "Mail of the USSR". This postal stamp went into circulation on 10 July 1991.

After the collapse of the Soviet Union, Ukraine declared its independence and the first stamps of the new republic were issued on 1 March 1992.

In 1992 the Ukrainian Post Office overprinted stamps of the Soviet Union with stylised tridents for use in Kyiv, Lviv and Chernihiv. Other Soviet stamps overprinted with similar designs are not believed to have been postally valid.

Since 1992, a variety of commemorative and definitive stamps have been issued.

=== Russian aggression and full invasion ===
In 2014, the Republic of Crimea was declared and subsequently annexed by Russia. Crimea now uses Russian postage stamps.

The self-declared unrecognized Donetsk People's Republic issued its first stamp in 2015.

After the full invasion of Ukraine by Russia in February 2022, Ukrposhta issued its first postage stamp related to the war, the "Russian warship, go fuck yourself" stamp, to commemorate the moment of the Ukrainian soldiers on Snake Island issuing a defiant response to the Russian cruiser the Moskva. A total of one million stamps were issued, 700,000 each for both the domestic and international denominated stamps, 200,000 were set aside for regions of Ukraine occupied by Russia and 100,000 were made for sale online.

Since the invasion, Ukrposhta has issued subsequent postage stamps commemorating the defense of Ukraine by its armed forces and its people and by also referencing key moments from the war, further supporting the efforts of the defense of Ukraine and also creating propaganda directed against Russia.

== See also ==
- Ukrainian shah
- Ukrposhta
- Donbas Post, self-declared postal authority for the unrecognized Donetsk and Luhansk People's Republics
- Postage stamps and postal history of Russia
