= Ukrainian shah =

Former currency of Ukraine

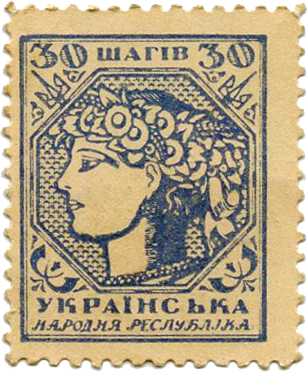
Thirty-shah stamp of Ukrainian People's Republic (1918). The young woman depicted in the stamp symbolizes the young Ukrainian nation.

Shah (Ukrainian: шаг) was the name of several currencies used in Ukraine. The forms shahy (шаги, for 2 to 4) and shahiv (шагiв, for five or more) are declensional plurals of the noun used in denominations, for example, 2 shahy, 20 shahiv.

== Etymology ==
According to etymological studies, the word shah arose from an earlier siah (сяг — “step”; “extent”), which ascends to Proto-Slavic *sęgъ (“length measured with outstretched arms”), formed from *sęgati (“to stretch out the arm”). The same origin is shared with other Ukrainian words like sazhen' (сажень < Old East Slavic: сѧжєнь — “fathom”) and siahaty (сягати — “to touch”; “to reach”).

The modern form of the word evolved through assimilation in the diminutive siazhok (сяжок), that had changed to shazhok (шажок), from which shah emerged.

Ukrainian historians believe that the name shah (as well as the diminutive shazhok) refers to “the smallest step when counting money” and is an authentic element of Ukrainian lexical heritage. To this day, the meaning of shah as the smallest amount of money is preserved in the Ukrainian language.

== 17th–19th centuries ==
Ukrainian-speakers used the term shah to refer to the Polish–Lithuanian Commonwealth's silver coin of 17th-18th centuries with face value of 3 grosz, coined from 1528, and especially during the times of Sigismund III Vasa (ruled Poland–Lithuania from 1587 to 1632). Later, when the Ukrainian lands came increasingly under the influence of Russia, the name was transferred to the Russian copper coin of 2 kopecks. From 1839, when the Russian Empire extended its silver coinage, the term shah was transferred to the silver ½-kopeck. This term for the kopeck remained in use until 1917.

== Early 20th century ==
In 1917, banknotes were introduced in the newly independent Ukraine. These were denominated in shah, hryvnia and karbovanets, with 100 shahiv = 1 hryvnia and 2 hryvni = 1 karbovanets.

At the beginning of the 20th century, during World War I (1914–1918), many countries issued currency in the form of stamps. It was done similarly in early independent Ukrainian states: in West Ukrainian National Republic and Ukrainian People's Republic. There, these money stamps were called shahivky (шагiвки, singular: шагiвка, shahivka). Stamps in denominations of 10, 20, 30, 40, and 50 shahs were issued.

These shahivky were printed on perforated 11 ½ card stock, due to a shortage of metals needed for the war effort at the time. Each currency stamp was inscribed on the reverse with a tryzub (trident) and with some words stating that these shahivky circulate in lieu of coins and that they are prohibited to be used as stamps. However, they do appear on some postal envelopes as there was an acute deficiency of "true" stamps. Nevertheless, on July 18, 1918, the independent Ukrainian government authorized its first set of stamp issues, also called shahivky and having nearly identical designs.

The 10 and 20-shah stamps issues of Ukrainian People's Republic were designed by the artist Anton Sereda and the 30, 40, and 50-shah stamps by Heorhiy Narbut, a master graphic artist and president of the Ukrainian Academy of Arts in Kyiv.

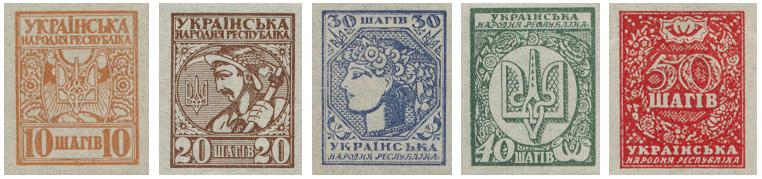
This 1918 issue of shahs was designed by graphic artists Anton Sereda and Heorhiy Narbut.

== Late 20th–21st centuries ==
In 1992, after the dissolution of the Soviet Union after which the newly independent Ukraine was able to choose its own currency, trial runs of coins of 1 shah and 50 shahiv were issued, but were not approved. Therefore, the kopiyka (копійка) was confirmed as a numismatic term for Ukrainian currency, despite nationalistic sentiments that kopiyka (a cognate of Russian kopeyka) is a Russian term.

On 2 September 2024, the National Bank of Ukraine proposed to rename the kopiyka to the historical shah as a part of the derussification campaign.

== See also ==
- Postage stamps and postal history of Ukraine
- Ukrainian hryvnia, the national currency of Ukraine since 1996
- Ukrainian karbovanets, currency of Ukraine during three separate periods
- Economy of Ukraine
