= Donbas Post =

Postal operator in the unrecognised self-proclaimed Donetsk People's Republic

- Native name: Почта Донбасса
- Romanized name: Pochta Donbassa
- Type: State-owned enterprise
- Industry: Postal service courier
- Founded: 10 October 2014; 11 years ago
- Headquarters: Artema 72, Donetsk, Donetsk People's Republic (de facto); Ukraine (de jure)
- Key people: Denis Neudachin (director)
- Owner: Government of the Donetsk People's Republic
- Number of employees: over 1750
- Website: postdonbass.com

Donbas Post (Russian: Почта Донбасса, romanized: Pochta Donbassa; Ukrainian: Пошта Донбасу) is an enterprise that operates the postal system of the self-proclaimed Donetsk People's Republic and the Luhansk People's Republic, the non-recognized entities created by Russia-backed separatists on the illegally annexed Ukrainian territories. It has been difficult for its operation due to the Russian aggression in Ukraine being upscaled to a full scale invasion of Russia and the Donbass region being a key region of the fighting.

== Description ==
The state-owned company was created on December 9, 2014, in Donetsk by an edict of the leader of the DPR Alexander Zakharchenko on the basis of the Ukrainian state company Ukrposhta — on that date the first five post offices commenced operations. Сreation of the structure was necessitated by termination of Ukrposhta operations in the areas of the Donetsk and Luhansk Oblasts of Ukraine not controlled by Kyiv.

The DPR Ministry of Communications oversees the Post of Donbas operations. The CEO of the state-owned enterprise is Yevgeny Kovnatsky. After establishing on March 23, 2015, of mail service between self-proclaimed Donetsk and Luhansk People's Republics, Donbas Post united the postal services of both republic.

As of March 2015, there were 20 post offices of the company in DPR and 21 post offices in LPR. Victor Yatsenko, DPR Minister of Communications told in October 2015 that the Post of Donbas had 196 post offices in the two People's Republics.

After the Russian annexation of Donetsk, Kherson, Luhansk and Zaporizhzhia oblasts during the Russian invasion of Ukraine in 2022, most of the postal service in the Donbass and the other occupied regions of southern Ukraine changed to Russian Post.

== Activities ==
The company is not a member of the Universal Postal Union. It uses postage stamps issued by Ukrposhta, with its own cancels. Mail is temporarily accepted only at the mail operator's post offices; letters are not collected from the letter boxes.

As of December 30, 2014, the December post-retirement benefits were paid to disabled persons residing in the DPR, through the Donbas Post's post offices. Starting from April 2015, an edict of the DPR's leader officially made Donbas Post, together with the republic's Central Republican Bank, responsible for regular payment of pensions and benefits to the population. For example, in June 2015 the DPR's elderly were paid via this postal system over a billion rubles and in July about two billion. In addition, starting from August 2015, the post offices are entrusted with distribution of SIM cards of the DPR's mobile operator Fenix.

== Postage stamps ==
Preparations for issue of its own stamps were underway since March 2015, and by May 9 the first such stamp was issued in DPR and LPR depicting "DPR soldiers Arseny Pavlov and Mikhail Tolstykh better known by the population as "Givi" and "Motorola"."

Donbas Post issued a series of seven definitive stamps in 2015 depicting the coats of arms of DPR's cities and towns. The seventh stamp appeared on December 17, 2015. The 24-ruble stamp depicted the smaller coat of arms of the Donetsk People's Republic's capital, Donetsk. The preceding stamps of the series presented coats of arms of Gorlovka, Shakhtersk, Dokuchaevsk, Debaltsevo, Yenakievo and Ilovaysk. A special cancellation was held on the occasion of the issue of each stamp in the corresponding town.

== Ukrposhta's position ==
Acting General Director of Ukrposhta, Ihor Tkachuk, told Forbes Ukraine in August 2015:

Ukrposhta has not and cannot have any mutual interrelations with the mail service that has started working in the so called "republics" in the territory not controlled by Ukraine. We do not recognize them... We do not operate there, lest we would legitimate the invader.

Nevertheless, as of autumn 2015, Ukrainian postage stamps were on sale at the Central Post Office of Donetsk for Russian rubles. Meanwhile, post office employees warned that letters, wrappers and parcels franked with those stamps could be sent only in the territory of Ukraine, and DPR had its own stamps.

LNR Post (Почта ЛНР) is the corollary postal authority of the Luhansk People's Republic (LPR).
