= Ukrainian Underground Post =

Unrecognized Ukrainian nationalist postal agency

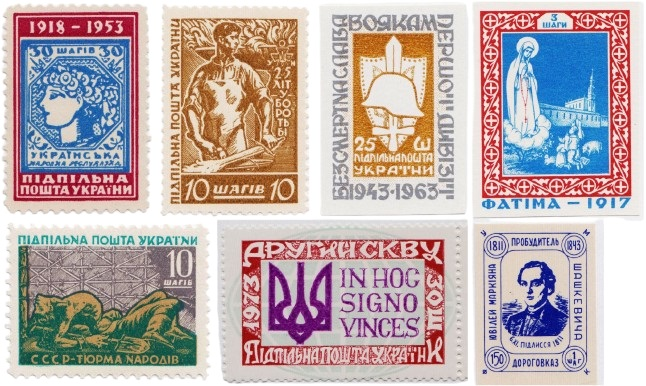
Postal stamps made by the Ukrainian Underground Post

The Ukrainian Underground Post or Underground Post of Ukraine (Ukrainian: Підпільна пошта України, romanized: Pidpilna poshta Ukrainy), commonly abbreviated as PPU, was an internationally unrecognized Ukrainian diaspora postal agency based in Munich, West Germany, and in Chicago, United States that released cinderella stamps worldwide from its opening in 1949 until its closure in 1983. The Ukrainian war veteran and prisoner of war Stepan Liubomyr Rychtyckyj developed an interest in philately and, with Julian Maksymchuk, helped to found the organisation in West Germany. It operated under a branch of the Organisation of Ukrainian Nationalists, an authoritarian nationalist organisation that sought a Ukrainian state independent from the Soviet Union after its annexation of the Ukrainian People's Republic in 1921.

The PPU stamps celebrated Ukrainian nationalism by promoting Ukrainian organisations/institutions, events, and famous individuals in its stamp designs, which were designed by pools of distinguished artists. In total, it had issued more than 3,700 postal stamp issues, which were diverse in paper types and colors. The stamps were utilised for propaganda purposes and helped to fund the OUN's resistance purposes against the Soviet Union and were not sold by the government of the Ukrainian People's Republic in exile. The Ukrainian Underground Post issued its last issues and then closed in 1983, the same year that the agency's chief Rychtyckyj died.

== Background ==
Amidst the collapse of rule from the House of Romanov as a result of the 1917 Russian Revolution, along with the Ukrainian–Soviet War beginning the same year, the Ukrainian council Central Rada declared independence from the Bolsheviks the same year and formed the Ukrainian People's Republic (UNR). The German Empire attempted to install Ukrainian military leader Pavlo Skoropadskyi as the ruler of the Ukrainian People's Republic, but the collapse of the German Empire led to a coup d'état by UNR politicians, who established their own anti-Bolshevik Ukrainian State in 1918 just afterward. In 1919, the West Ukrainian People's Republic (which also declared independence in 1917) merged into the UNR as part of the Unification Act. In 1921, the UNR collapsed in its war against the Soviet Union, resulting in land divisions between the Soviet Union and Poland.

Ukrainian nationalism persisted due to a continued drive for an independent Ukrainian state. Among the most prominent examples was the far-right Organisation of Ukrainian Nationalists (OUN) (founded in 1929), a nationalist organisation that had fascistic and violent influences from Italy and racism and aimed to reestablish Ukrainian state independence. It found itself to be increasingly allied with Nazi Germany due to its struggle against both Poland and the Soviet Union, although they still sought to keep relations somewhat distant. The OUN was a major resistance movement (its main military formation being the Ukrainian Insurgent Army) that led rebellions in western Ukraine during World War II and up to the 1950s against the Soviet Union, which countered against it via warfare and large-scale deportations.

The Ukrainian People's Republic issued its own postal stamps during the 1910s and 1920s until its dissolution as did the Western Ukrainian People's Republic. In comparison, the Ukrainian Soviet Socialist Republic did not issue its own stamps but had become a member of the Universal Postal Union in 1947. The German occupation administration in Ukraine had also issued its own stamps for circulation in Ukraine during World War II. Exiled Ukrainian stamps had a history extending back to the late 1940s from displaced persons camps in Germany and Italy.

== History ==
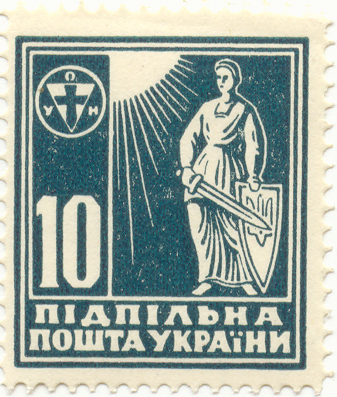
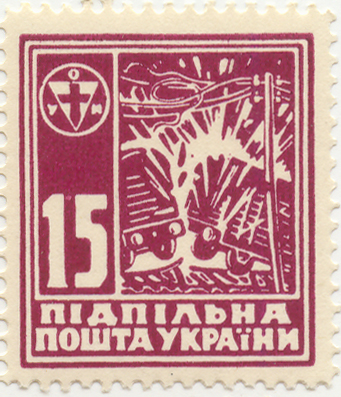
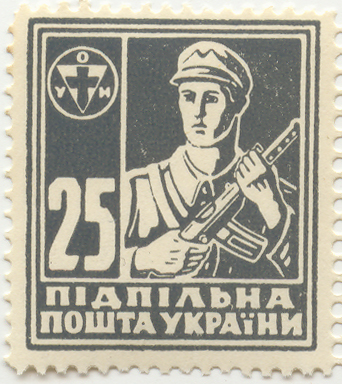
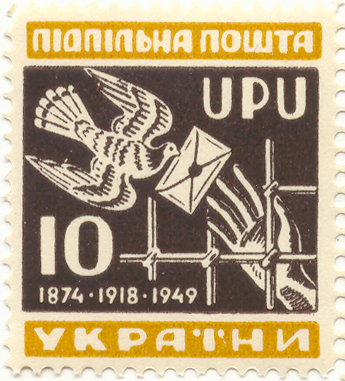
Images of some of the first stamps of the PPU released in 1949, the former three from Issue 1 and the latter from Issue 2.

The Ukrainian Underground Post (Ukrainian: Підпільна пошта України, converted in Ukrainian Latin alphabet to Pidpilna Poshta Ukrainy (abbeviation: PPU)), also known as the Underground Post of Ukraine, was founded by Ukrainian exiles from West Germany in 1949 under a branch of the Organisation of Ukrainian Nationalists. According to PPU stamp cataloguer and philatelist Stefan Golash, Regensburg resident and former 14th Waffen Grenadier Division of the SS (1st Galician) volunteer Stepan Liubomyr Rychtyckyj (writing under the pseudonym Stefan Liubomyrsky) first took interest in writing and philately while he and his former division were interred in a prisoner of war camp in the Italian city of Rimini until his release in 1946. In 1949, he met Ukrainian philatelist and fellow Regensburg resident Julian Maksymchuk, who with the latter's influence and guidance established the postal agency, which released its first set of stamps the same year. As an internationally unrecognized postal agency, the Underground Post of Ukraine issued non-state postage stamps that were primarily used for propaganda purposes.

The headquarters of the PPU was located in the German city of Munich, where the first postal stamps were also issued. The stamp issues were also released from Regensburg and Neu-Ulm within West Germany. Later stamp issues were released from the American city of Chicago in the 1960s but may have been released there as early as the late 1950s. As years passed, the Underground Post of Ukraine gradually released more stamp issues per year on average, with rates increasing with the establishment of stamps released in Chicago. The PPU enterprise was relocated to North America since Rychtyckyj and his family moved to Chicago in 1956. When Rychtyckyj died in 1983, the Underground Post of Ukraine released its last stamp issues and closed the same year. Although online auction sites have often used the "Ukrainian Post" or "Ukrainian Underground Post" to describe any Ukrainian diaspora stamps from 1945 to 1991, philatelist George D. Fedyk stressed that this, along with PPU issues being listed as "Ukraine Exile" issues, were both misleading to collectors. He further emphasized that only one organisation had ever adopted the "Ukrainian Underground Post" name.

== Services ==
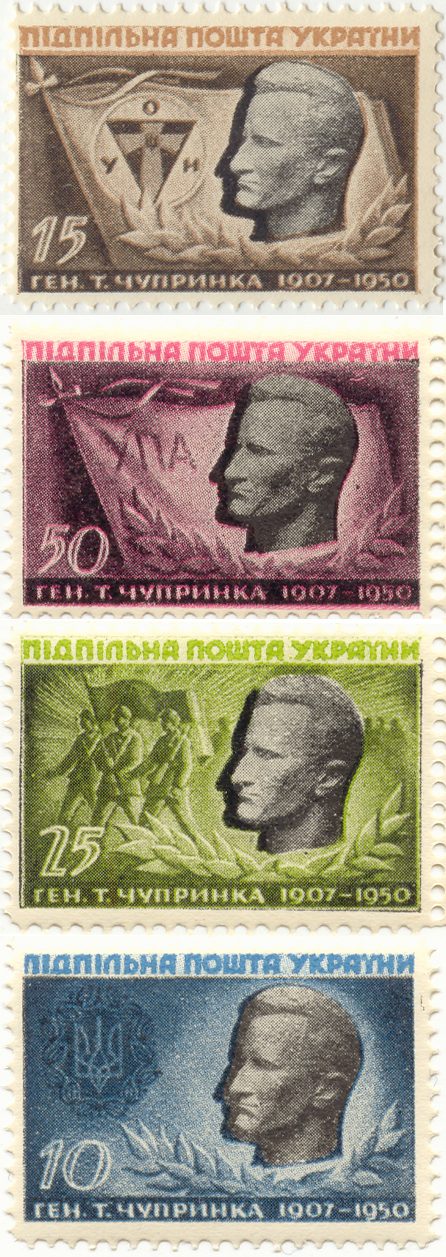
Lineup of different color variants of a stamp issue from 1950

The PPU was well-supported in funding by the OUN and had received large attention from the Ukrainian diaspora in many different countries. The stamps helped to fund the OUN (such as with revolutionary struggles against the Soviet Union) and were propaganda tools aimed towards the international community. In early years, the PPU network operated within Europe and the Americas but later spread worldwide. Many well-recognized Ukrainian artists were involved in the stamps' designs. The postal service had issued more than 3,700 stamp issues total, double that if the hinged and unhinged versions were to be counted separately. Stamp variations included whether or not it had watermarks on it, or what types of paper it used (i.e. chalky paper or ungummed paper). The PPU also issued many different color variants for stamp issues and even used up to 16 colors for stamps, a feat not closely replicated by other postal services at the time. The stamps often touched upon themes relating to Ukrainian nationalism and were usually specifically devoted to either organisations, events, individuals, or objects. Among the most recognized institutions and organisations by PPU stamps included Plast (or the Plast National Scout Organization of Ukraine), Ukrainian Insurgent Army, Organisation of Ukrainian Nationalists, and the Ukrainian Sich Riflemen. Some stamps were also issued to commemorate non-Ukrainian institutions like the United Nations, Universal Postal Union, Anti-Bolshevik Bloc of Nations, and the International Red Cross. Some of the most often commemorated individuals by stamps from the PPU include Taras Chuprynka, Taras Shevchenko, Ivan Franko, Yevhen Konovalets, Ivan Mazepa, and Stepan Bandera.

Because the Underground Post of Ukraine was not a government-based postal agency, the PPU stamps are officially "cinderella stamps", but they nonetheless followed the standards of postage stamp designs. It did not officially have a country name designated to its stamps, but it used its Ukrainian name and Ukrainian currency denominations. Contrary to the belief of some scholars, the PPU was not the official postal agency of the government of the Ukrainian People's Republic in exile; instead, the exiled body had its own Ukrainian National Council that issued its own stamps from 1948 until 1972. The PPU had its own foreign post office branch that ensured marketing and sales of the stamps.

== Honors ==
In 1952, the International Olympic Committee (IOC) displayed issues 18 and 19 postal stamps from the PPU, which are today housed at the Olympic Museum in Switzerland and the Bibliothèque nationale de France; the stamps marked both the 1952 Summer Olympics in Finland and 1952 Winter Olympics in Norway.

== See also ==
- Postage stamps and postal history of Ukraine
- Postage stamps of the Soviet Union
