= London 2010 Festival of Stamps =

Philately event in England

The festival logo.

The London 2010 Festival of Stamps is a yearlong series of events to mark the centenary of the accession of King George V to the British throne.

King George V was an enthusiastic and distinguished philatelist, and President, then Patron, of the Royal Philatelic Society London.

The festival will include a variety of philatelic or stamp themed events including the London 2010 International Stamp Exhibition, an exhibition at the Guildhall Art Gallery titled "Empire Mail: George V and the GPO" as well as events at the British Museum, the British Library, Marylebone Cricket Club Museum, Wimbledon Lawn Tennis Museum, Bletchley Park, Bath Postal Museum and Tw Ickenham Rugby Museum.

Events are being coordinated by The British Postal Museum & Archive.
