= Mark Kramer (disambiguation) =

Mark Kramer (born 1958), known as Kramer, is a musician, composer, record producer and founder of Shimmy-Disc.

Mark Kramer may also refer to:

- Mark Kramer (journalist) (fl. from 1969), American journalist, author, professor, and editor
- Mark Kramer (jazz pianist) (born 1945), American jazz pianist, composer, arranger, and producer/engineer
- Mark Kramer (historian), American historian, Director of the Harvard Project on Cold War Studies, has taught at Harvard, Yale, and Brown.
