= Pereiaslav Agreement =

1654 treaty between Zaporozhian Cossacks and Tsardom of Russia

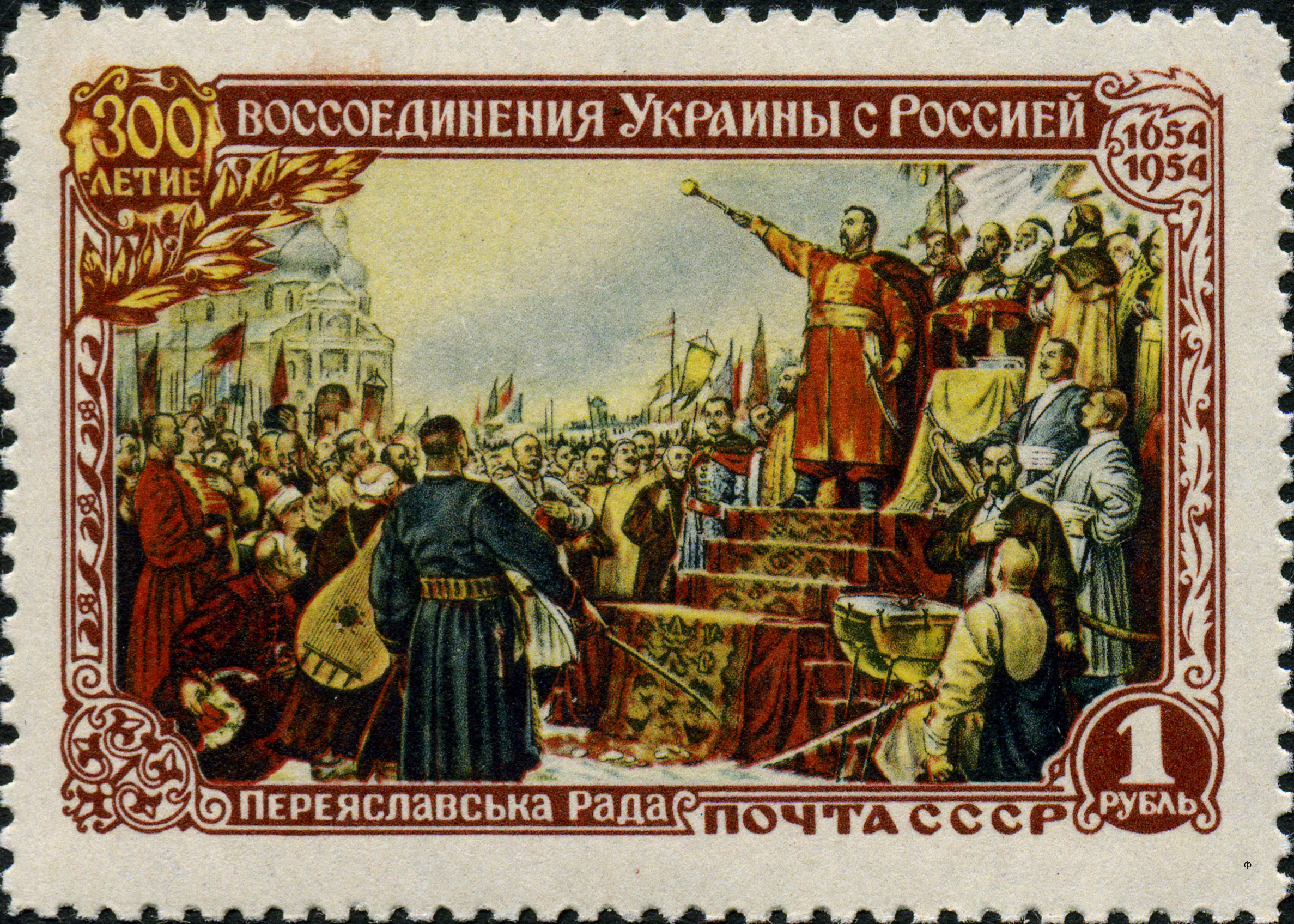
Pereiaslav Agreement depicted on a 1954 Soviet stamp. Cossacks are standing left with traditional costume and a bandura. Vasiliy Buturlin stands at right making a declaration.

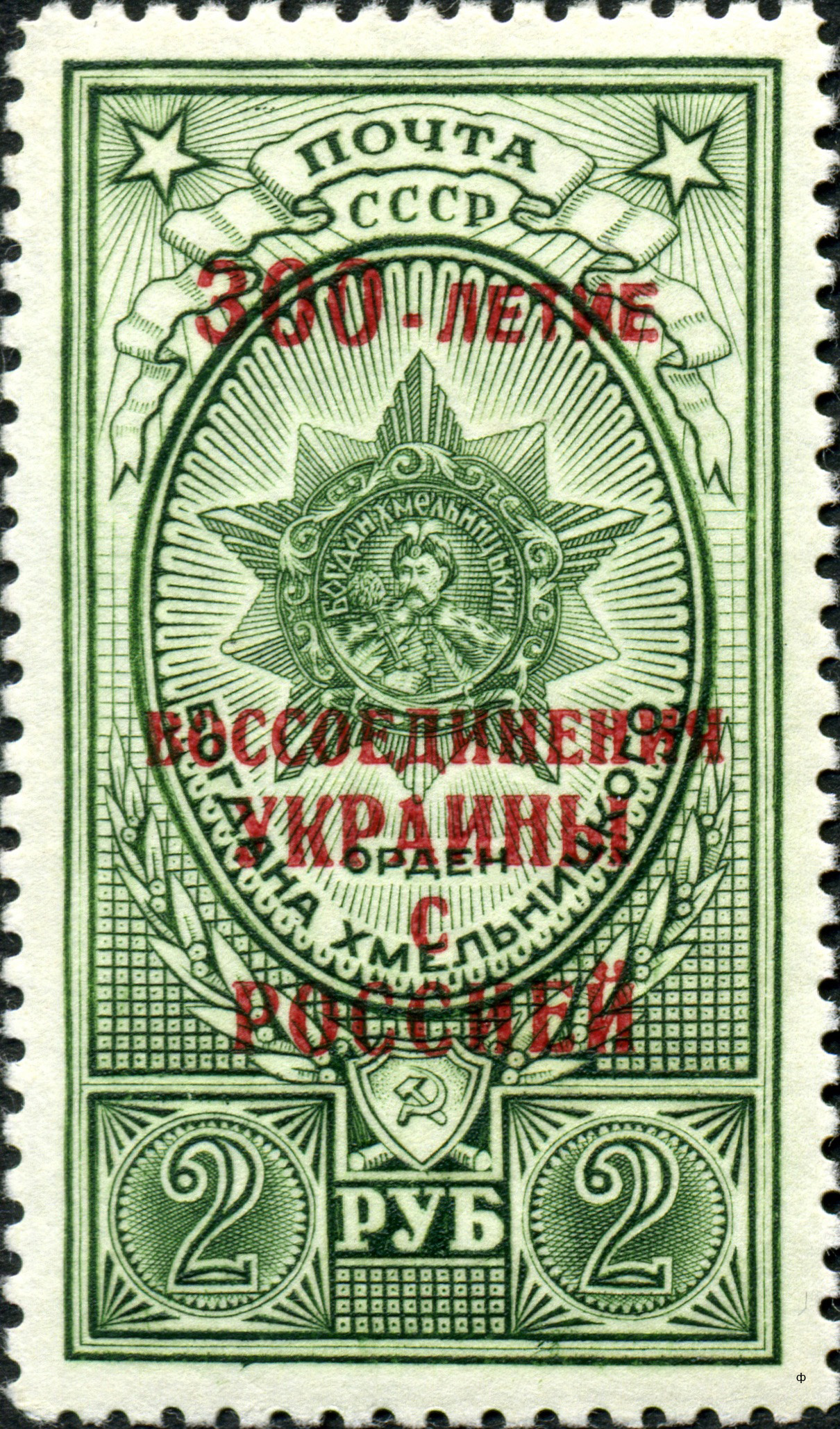
Soviet stamp in honor of the 300th anniversary of "Ukraine's reunification with Russia", 1954

The Pereiaslav Agreement or Pereyaslav Agreement (Ukrainian: Переяславська рада, romanized: Pereiaslavska Rada, lit. 'Pereiaslav Council', Russian: Переяславская рада) was an official meeting that convened for a ceremonial pledge of allegiance by Zaporozhian Cossacks to Russian tsar Alexis (r. 1645–1676) in the town of Pereiaslav in central Ukraine, in January 1654. The ceremony took place concurrently with ongoing negotiations that started on the initiative of Hetman Bohdan Khmelnytsky to address the issue of the Cossack Hetmanate with the ongoing Khmelnytsky Uprising against the Polish–Lithuanian Commonwealth and which concluded the Treaty of Pereiaslav (also known as the March Articles). The treaty itself was finalized in Moscow in April 1654 (in March according to the Julian calendar).

Khmelnytsky secured the military protection of the Tsardom of Russia in exchange for allegiance to the tsar. However, although the council was attended by a delegation from Moscow headed by Vasiliy Buturlin, the latter refused to swear an oath on behalf of the tsar, thus making it uncertain whether the Pereiaslav Agreement was legally binding. An oath of allegiance to the Russian monarch from the leadership of the Cossack Hetmanate was taken, shortly thereafter followed by other officials, the clergy and the inhabitants of the Hetmanate swearing allegiance. The exact nature of the relationship stipulated by the agreement between the Hetmanate and Russia is a matter of scholarly controversy. The council of Pereiaslav was followed by an exchange of official documents: first, the so-called March Articles from the Cossack Hetmanate, which stipulated an autonomous status of the Hetmanate within the Russian state. And second, the tsar's declaration (from Russia).

The agreement precipitated the Russo-Polish War of 1654–1667. The definitive legal settlement was effected under the Treaty of Perpetual Peace in 1686 concluded by Russia and Poland that re-affirmed Russia's sovereignty over the lands of Zaporozhian Sich and left-bank Ukraine, as well as the city of Kiev.

== Background of negotiations ==
In January 1648, a major anti-Polish uprising led by Bohdan Khmelnytsky began in the Zaporizhia lands. Supported by popular masses and by Crimean Khanate the rebels won a number of victories over the government forces of the Polish–Lithuanian Commonwealth seeking the increase of Cossack registry (kept at the expense of the state treasury), weakening of the Polish aristocratic oppression, oppression by the Jews who governed estates as well as recovery of positions of the Orthodox Church in own lands. However, the autonomy obtained by Khmelnytsky found itself squeezed between three Great powers: the Polish–Lithuanian Commonwealth, the Tsardom of Russia and the Ottoman Empire.

Being the main leader of the uprising, Bohdan Khmelnytskyi was not able to declare independence because he was not a legitimate monarch, and there was not such a candidate among other leaders of the uprising. Considering the economic and human resources, the rebellion was taking place in regions of the Polish Crown, Kijów (Kyiv), Czernihow (Chernihiv) and Bracław (Bratslav) voivodeships. The Crimean Khan, the only ally, was not interested in a decisive victory of Cossacks.

=== Cossack — Moscow negotiations timeline ===
It is believed that negotiations to unite the Zaporizhian lands with Russia started as early as in 1648. Such idea is common among Soviet historians of Ukraine and Russia such as Mykola Petrovsky. Many other Ukrainian historians among which are Ivan Krypiakevych, Dmitriy Ilovaisky, Myron Korduba, Valeriy Smoliy and others interpret negotiations as an attempt to attract the tsar to military support of Cossacks and motivate him to struggle for the Polish Crown which became available after the death of Władysław IV Vasa.

- 18 June 1648 – the first known official letter of Bohdan Khmelnytskyi to Tsar Alexis I; it was finished: "So let the God fulfill the prophecy, which was celebrated from ancient times, to which we gave ourselves, and to the merciful feet of your royal majesty, like the lower ones, submit obediently."
- 18 June 1648 – letter of Khmelnytskyi to the Muscovite voivode of Siveria, Leontiev. Mention of favorable attitude of the Cossacks to the tsar. The issue of allegiance to the tsar is not raised.
- 21 July 1648 – letter of Khmelnytskyi to the Muscovite voivode of Putivl, Pleshcheyev. Mention of motivation of the Russian tsar to the struggle for the Polish Crown. The issue of allegiance to the tsar is not raised.
- end of December 1648 – departing of Khmelnytskyi delegation to Moscow. The delegation included the chief envoy Syluyan Muzhylovsky and Patriarch Paisius I of Jerusalem.
- January 1649 – in Moscow, Patriarch Paisius convinced the tsar of Khmelnytskyi's intentions "...striking with forehead to your Imperial Majesty, so the emperor ordered to grant him, Khmelnytskyi and all the Zaporizhian Host adoption under His high imperial hand...", but in the Muzhylovsky's notes is mentioned only request for military assistance, while the issue of allegiance to the Tsar was not raised.
- April 1649 – meeting of Khmelnytskyi with the tsar's envoy Grigoriy Unkovsky in Chyhyryn. The Hetman emphasized the kinship of Ukraine and Muscovy: "...from the baptizing by St. Volodimer', we had with Moscow our one pious Christian faith and one power..." and asked for military assistance.
- May 1649 – deportation of Khmelnytskyi's envoys to Moscow headed by Chyhyryn Colonel Fedir Veshnyak. In accreditation letter it was expressed petition for protectorate of the Russian tsar. "...take under own mercy and defense... all of Ruthenia". Alexis refused Veshnyak's offer with the pretext that he did not wish to break the "eternal" Treaty of Polyanovka (1634) with the Commonwealth, which had ended the Smolensk War. At the same time, a similar delegation was sent to the Prince of Transylvania George II Rákóczi to encourage him to fight for the Polish Crown.
- 16 August 1649: The Cossacks achieved a hollow victory at the Battle of Zboriv. Abandoned by the Crimean Khanate at Zboriv, Bohdan Khmelnytskyi blamed Moscow for not sending help. Cossack-Moscow relations worsened. The Hetman and his associates resorted to diplomatic pressure on Moscow: they openly expressed the need for a campaign against the Muscovites, and refused to extradite impostor Timofey Akudinov who claimed to be the son of tsar Vasili IV of Russia.
- 18 August 1649 N.S.: The Commonwealth and Cossacks concluded the Treaty of Zboriv, which recognised the Cossack Hetmanate as an autonomous territory within the Commonwealth, but subject to the Sejm and the King, and with a maximum of 40,000 Registered Cossacks. Due to conflicting reports about the Treaty of Zboriv and Khmelnytsky's intentions, tsar Alexis prohibited contact between his officers and Khmelnytsky.
- October 1649: Tsarist envoy Grigorii Neronov rejected Khmelnytsky's suggestion that Muscovy should protect both the Cossacks and their Crimean Tatar allies, because the Crimean Khan was a vassal of the Ottoman Sultan. Khmelnytsky tried to persuade Neronov by pointing out that the Crimean Khan was dissatisfied with the Ottomans at the time.
- January 1650: Muscovite envoys Grigorii Pushkin, Stepan Pushkin and Gavrila Leontev were sent to Warsaw to demand punishment for Poles who improperly recorded Alexis' title in official documents (he was supposed to be the "Tsar of Russia", not the "Prince of Moscow"), and threatened war unless the Commonwealth "returned the cities taken by Wladystaw IV and punished those who had insulted the tsar."
- March 1650 – Khmelnytskyi ignored orders of the king of Poland on preparations to a shared Polish-Crimean campaign against Moscow.
- Summer-fall of 1650 – revival of the Turkish-Ukrainian dialogue to transfer under the Ottoman protectorate: "... Ukraine, White Ruthenia, Volhynia, Podolie with whole Ruthenia all the way to Wisla..."
- Throughout 1651–1652: Muscovy was clearly still not interested in risking war with the Commonwealth by supporting the Ukrainian rebels. All Muscovite diplomatic efforts against the Commonwealth throughout 1651 and 1652 were squarely focused on the supposed deliberate dishonouring of the tsar in official Commonwealth correspondence.
- 1 March 1651 – Zemsky Sobor in Moscow. The Moscow clergy found it possible in case of not following by the Polish side conditions of the Eternal Peace permit Alexis Mikhailovich to adopt the Zaporizhian Host as one of his subjects.
- September 1651 – Osman-aga, an Ottoman envoy, arrived to Chyhyryn, and informed about readiness of the High Porte to take Ukraine under its protection. Khmelnytskyi did not rush, anticipating Moscow's answer.
- 28 (18) September 1651: Khmelnytsky and Grand Crown Hetman Mikołaj Potocki signed the Treaty of Bila Tserkva after several Cossack defeats and the Crimean Khan had abandoned the Cossacks.
- March 1652 – Khmelnytskyi's envoys in Moscow. Envoy Ivan Iskra proposed immediately to take the Zaporizhian Host under the tsar's custody. The tsar's government agreed to take only the army without the territory, anticipating in the future to give it lands in the interfluve of Don and Medveditsa.
- 31 August 1652: Khmelnytsky's son Tymofiy (Tymish) married Princess Ruxandra Lupu, daughter of the Ottoman vassal Vasile Lupu, Prince of Moldavia, establishing a marriage alliance between the Cossack Hetmanate and Moldavia.

== Preparations for official meeting ==
On 11 (1) October 1653, the Zemskii Sobor ((Assembly of the Land) that took place in Moscow in the fall adopted the decision to intervene in Commonwealth affairs in order to protect the Orthodox population there against persecution. This was the last time the Zemskii Sobor was ever convened; it had ceased to function by the mid-17th century. On 2 November 1653, the Moscow government declared war on the Polish–Lithuanian Commonwealth. To conduct negotiations between two states, a large delegation headed by the boyar Vasili Buturlin departed from Moscow to Ukraine. In its composition were also okolnichiy Ivan Olferiev (Alferov), dyak Larion Lopukhin and representatives of the clergy.

The travel took almost three months. Besides bad roads and disorder, a new royal standard had to be made, the Buturlin's speech text, and the mace (bulawa) designated to Hetman disappeared several precious stones that had to be recovered. Also, the delegation had to wait almost a week for arrival of Bohdan Khmelnytskyi, who was delayed in Chyhyryn at the burial of his older son Tymofiy Khmelnytsky and later was not able to cross the Dnieper since the ice on the river was not strong enough. On 23 (13) December 1653, a Cossack committee led by Teteria welcomed the Buturlin delegation outside Pereiaslav and escorted them into the city. On 16 (6) January 1654, Hetman Bohdan Khmelnytsky arrived in Pereiaslav, and one day later secretary-general Ivan Vyhovsky.

== Pereiaslav meeting and the autonomous Cossack state ==
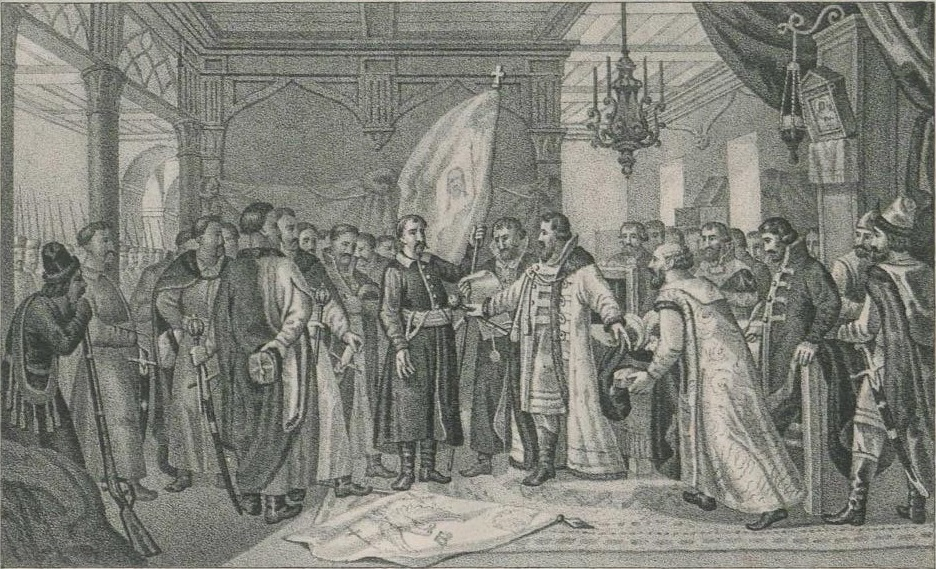
19th-century Romantic fantasy engraving by Boris Chorikov, portraying boyar Buturlin receiving an oath of loyalty to the Russian Tsar from Bohdan Khmelnytsky

At a meeting between the council of Zaporozhian Cossacks and Vasiliy Buturlin, representative of Tsar Alexis I of Russia, during the Khmelnytsky Uprising. The Pereiaslav Council of Ukrainians took place on January 18; it was meant to act as the supreme Cossack council and demonstrate the unity and determination of the "Rus' nation". Military leaders and representatives of regiments, nobles and townspeople listened to the speech by the Cossack hetman Bohdan Khmelnytsky, who expounded the necessity of seeking the Russian protection. The audience responded with applause and consent. The treaty, initiated with Buturlin later on the same day, invoked only protection of the Cossack state by the tsar and was intended as an act of official separation of Ukraine from the Polish–Lithuanian Commonwealth (Ukrainian independence had been informally declared earlier in the course of the Uprising by Khmelnytsky). Participants in the preparation of the treaty at Pereiaslav included, besides Khmelnytsky, Chief Scribe Ivan Vyhovsky and numerous other Cossack elders, as well as a large visiting contingent from Russia.

The Cossack leaders tried in vain to exact from Buturlin some binding declarations; the envoy refused, claiming lack of authority and deferred resolution of specific issues to future rulings by the tsar, which he expected to be favourable to the Cossacks. Khmelnytsky and many Ukrainians (127,000 total, including 64,000 Cossacks, according to the Russian reckoning) ended up swearing allegiance to the Tsar. In many Ukrainian towns, residents were forced to go to the central square to take the oath. Part of the Orthodox clergy took the oath only after a long resistance, and some Cossack leaders did not take the oath. The actual details of the agreement were negotiated the following March and April in Moscow by Cossack emissaries and the Tsardom. The Russians agreed to the majority of the Ukrainian demands, granting the Cossack state broad autonomy, large Cossack register and preservation of the status of the Kiev Orthodox Metropolitan, who would keep reporting to the Patriarch of Constantinople (rather than Moscow). The Cossack hetman was prohibited from conducting independent foreign policy, especially in respect to the Commonwealth and the Ottoman Empire, as the Tsardom pledged now to provide the Hetmanate's defense. The status of Ukraine, seen by the negotiators as being now in union with the Russian state (rather than Poland), was thus settled. The erroneous but stubborn policies of the Commonwealth are widely seen as the cause of the Cossacks' changed direction, which gave rise to a new and lasting configuration of power in central, eastern and southern Europe.

The seemingly generous provisions of the Pereiaslav-Moscow pact were soon undermined by practical politics, Moscow's imperial policies and Khmelnytsky's own maneuvering. Disappointed by the Truce of Vilna (1656) and other Russian moves, he attempted to extricate the Hetmanate from the dependency. The Pereyaslav treaty led to the outbreak of the Russo-Polish War (1654-1667) and in 1667 to the Truce of Andrusovo, in which eastern Ukraine was ceded by Poland to Russia (in practice it meant a limited recovery of western Ukraine by the Commonwealth). The Cossack Hetmanate, the autonomous Ukrainian state established by Khmelnytsky, was later restricted to left-bank Ukraine and existed under the Russian Empire until it was destroyed by Russia in 1764-1775.

The contemporary written records of the Pereiaslav-Moscow transactions do exist and are kept in the Russian State Archive of Ancient Acts in Moscow.

== Historical consequences ==
The eventual consequence for the Hetmanate was the dissolution of the Zaporizhian Host in 1775 and the imposition of serfdom in the region.

For Russia, the deal eventually led to the full incorporation of the Cossack Hetmanate into the Russian state, providing a justification for the title of Russian tsars and emperors, the autocrat of all Russia (Russian: Самодержецъ Всероссійскій). Russia, being at that time the only part of former Kievan Rus' which was not dominated by a foreign power, considered itself the successor of Kievan Rus' and the re-unifier of all the lands of Rus'. Subsequently, in the 20th century, in Soviet history and epistemology, the Council of Pereiaslav was viewed and referred to as an act of "re-unification of Ukraine with Russia".

The treaty was a political plan to save Ukraine from Polish domination. For the Polish–Lithuanian Commonwealth, the deal provided one of the early signs of its gradual decline and eventual demise by the end of the 18th century.

The decision adopted in Pereiaslav is viewed by Ukrainian nationalists negatively as a failed opportunity for Ukrainian independence. Ukrainian statehood during the Russian Civil War was short-lived as a result of the Ukrainian–Soviet War, with the country finally achieving independence during the dissolution of the Soviet Union.

== Legacy ==
=== Historiography ===
The treaty of Pereiaslav has received various evaluations by historians and lawyers. One point of view, represented among others by Dmitry Odinets, Iakov Rosenfeld and Venedikt Miakotin, saw it as an act of incorporation of Ukraine into the Tsardom of Moscow; others, such as Boris Nolde, claimed that the treaty provided autonomy to Ukraine inside of the Tsardom and the succeeding Russian Empire; Mikhail Diakonov, Aleksandr Filippov and Aleksandr Popov saw it as a real union of two states, meanwhile Vasily Sergeevich and Rostyslav Lashchenko described the agreement as a personal union under the Tsar. Scholars have variously characterized relations between the Cossack Hetmanate and the Tsardom of Moscow as vassalage (Nikolay Korkunov, V. Miakotin, Mikhail Pokrovsky, Mykhailo Hrushevsky), protectorate (Dmytro Doroshenko, Ivan Krypiakevych), quasi-protectorate, or military union (Vyacheslav Lypynsky, Oleksander Ohloblyn).

During the early years of Communist rule, Soviet historians tended to view the agreement in purely class terms, seeing it as a pact between feudal landowners aimed at increasing the exploitation of proletarians. However, under the rule of Stalin, starting from the 1930s, Soviet historiography started fully denying the legal character of Pereyaslav agreement, claiming to be an act of "unification of two brotherly people inside of the Russian state". The image of Bohdan Khmelnytsky, whom the early Soviet scholars had characterized as a large-scale feudal, who had sold Ukrainian peasants to the Tsar and his landowners, also underwent a transformation, with the hetman being proclaimed a patriotic statesman, who supposedly liberated his people from Polish yoke and unified it with Russia.

=== Commemoration ===
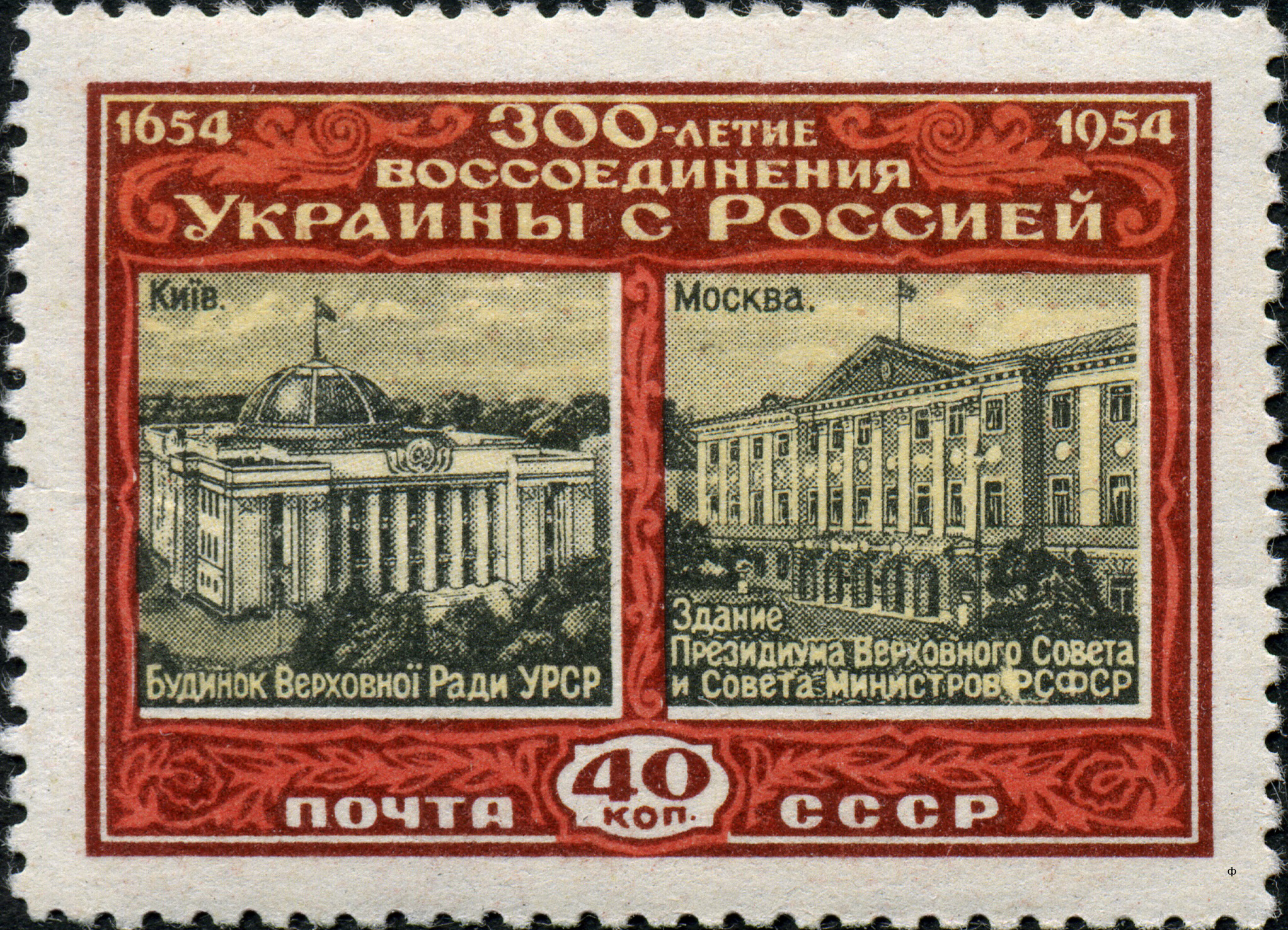
1954 Soviet stamp marking the 300th anniversary of "Ukraine's reunification with Russia".

In 1954, anniversary celebrations of "Ukraine's re-unification with Russia" were widespread in the Soviet Union and included the transfer of Crimea from the Russian Soviet Federative Socialist Republic to the Ukrainian Soviet Socialist Republic. Almost 44 million Soviet rubles were allocated by Soviet authorities in Moscow to the government of Soviet Ukraine in order to organize the festivities. A massive propaganda campaign was initiated in Soviet press, culminating with the publication of "Theses about the 300-th anniversary of the Unification of Ukraine with Russia", approved by the Central Committee of the Communist Party of the Soviet Union. The document contained declarations claiming, among others, a common descent of Ukrainians and Russians, as well as Belarusians, from the Rus state, postulating their close relation in terms of language, culture and mentality, and underlining, that freedom and independence of the Ukrainian people were only possible in union with Russia as part of the Soviet Union, where the national question had supposedly been solved for the first time in history. A number of prominent Ukrainian Soviet authors, including Pavlo Tychyna and Mykola Bazhan, presented their new literary works dedicated to the anniversary.

In 2004, after the celebration of the 350th anniversary of the event, the administration of President Leonid Kuchma of Ukraine established January 18 as the official date to commemorate the event.

In 2023, Polish president Andrzej Duda suggested to Ukrainian president Volodymyr Zelenskyy the idea of bringing the Russians to Pereiaslav following a hypothetical Russian defeat during the Russian invasion of Ukraine for the signal of a peace treaty.

== See also ==
- Cossack Hetmanate
- History of the Polish–Lithuanian Commonwealth (1648–1764)
- Khmelnytsky Uprising
- Pereiaslav Articles
- Union of Russia and Ukraine Tercentenary

== Literature ==
=== Printed and e-books ===
- Basarab, John (1982). Pereiaslav 1654: A Historiographical Study. Edmonton: Canadian Institute of Ukrainian Studies. Archived from the original on 7 March 2019.
- Braichevsky, M. Annexation or Unification?: Critical Notes on One Conception, ed and trans G. Kulchycky (Munich 1974)
- Hrushevs’kyi, M. Istoriia Ukraïny-Rusy, vol 9, bk 1 (Kyiv 1928; New York 1957) [in Ukrainian].
- Iakovliv, A. Ukraïns’ko-moskovs’ki dohovory v XVII–XVIII vikakh (Warsaw 1934) [in Ukrainian].
- Dohovir het’mana Bohdana Khmel’nyts’koho z moskovs’kym tsarem Oleksiiem Mykhailovychem (New York 1954) [in Ukrainian].
- O'Brien, C.B. Muscovy and the Ukraine: From the Pereiaslavl Agreement to the Truce of Andrusovo, 1654–1667 (Berkeley and Los Angeles 1963)
- Ohloblyn, A. Treaty of Pereyaslav 1654 (Toronto and New York 1954)
- Plokhy, Serhii (2022). The Gates of Europe: A History of Ukraine. New York, NY: Basic Books. p. 414. ISBN 978-0-465-07394-8. (e-book)
- Prokopovych, V. ‘The Problem of the Juridical Nature of the Ukraine's Union with Muscovy,’ AUA, 4 (Winter–Spring 1955)
- Pereiaslavs'ka rada 1654 roku. Istoriohrafiia ta doslidzhennia (Kyiv 2003) [in Ukrainian].
- Velychenko, S., THE INFLUENCE OF HISTORICAL, POLITICAL, AND SOCIAL IDEAS, ON THE POLITICS OF BOHDAN KHMELNYTSKY AND THE COSSACK OFFICERS BETWEEN 1648 AND 1657 PhD Dissertation (University of London, 1981) <>

=== Online ===
- To the History of the Treaty of Pereyaslav, Zerkalo Nedeli (the Mirror Weekly), October 4–10, 2003, available online in Russian and in Ukrainian.
- Encyclopedia of Ukraine entry on the subject
- Ukrainian World Congress' Statement Press Release - On Observance of the Pereyaslav Treaty
- The Treaty of Pereyaslav
