= Ivan Krypiakevych =

Ukrainian historian (1886–1967)

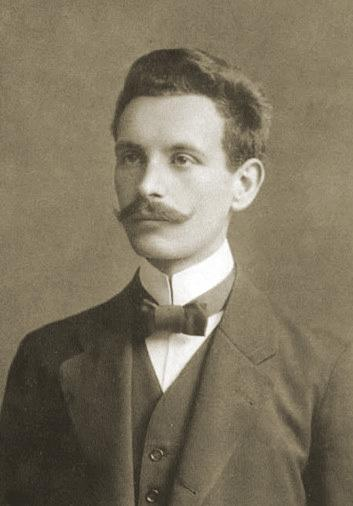
Ivan Krypiakevych

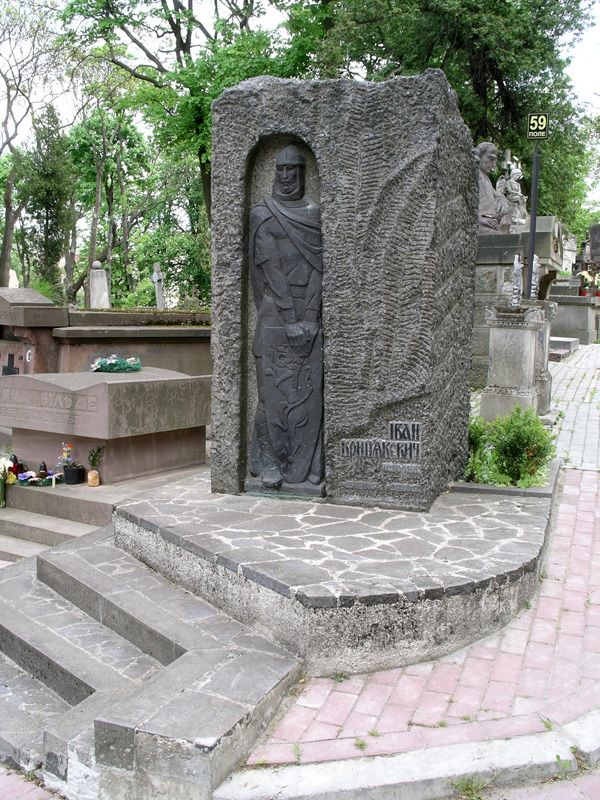
Tomb of Ivan Krypiakevych at Lychakivskiy Cemetery, Lviv.

Ivan Petrovych Krypiakevych (Ukrainian: Іван Петрович Крип'якевич; 25 June 1886 – 21 April 1967) was a Ukrainian historian, academician, professor of Lviv University and director of the Institute of Social Sciences of Ukraine. He was a specialist on Ukrainian history of the 15th, 16th, and 17th centuries, writing extensively on the social history of western Ukraine and the political history of the Ukrainian Cossacks, especially during the time of Hetman Bohdan Khmelnytsky. He also wrote many textbooks for school use, popularizations, and some historical fiction for children.

== Austrian period ==
Krypiakevych was born and raised in Lemberg (Lviv) in Austrian Galicia in a family of the Greek Catholic priest and emigrant from the Chełm Land. During his school years Krypiakevych talked exclusively in Polish. Later he studied history under Mykhailo Hrushevsky at Lviv University. He wrote his 1911 doctorate on "The Cossacks and Bathory's Privileges," a study of the origins of the Ukrainian Cossacks legally registered with the Polish government. From 1908 to 1914, he published extensively in Galician Ukrainian journals and magazines and took part in the Prosvita, or "Enlightenment" movement geared to raise the educational level of the Galician Ukrainian peasantry. From 1905, he began publishing in the scholarly journal of the Shevchenko Scientific Society, which under the leadership of Hrushevsky became a kind of unofficial Ukrainian Academy of Sciences serving the Ukrainian people on both sides of the Austrian-Russian border. In 1907 Krypiakevych on the notice of Andrzej Kazimierz Potocki, a Governor of the Kingdom of Galicia and Lodomeria, was imprisoned for student protests that took place near the Lviv University. He initially was detained as a terrorist, but later it was degraded as disturbing a public peace.

From 1911 to 1939, he taught at the Polish gymnasia (High Schools) at Zhovkva and Rohatyn and at the Academic Gymnasium in Lviv. From 1918 to 1919, he taught at the newly established Ukrainian University at Kamianets-Podilskyi but returned to Galicia (now absorbed into Poland) at the fall of the Ukrainian People's Republic to the Soviets. In 1921-25 Krypiakevych was a professor of the clandestine Lviv Ukrainian University.

== Interwar Galicia ==
During the interwar period, Krypiakevych, being excluded from a university position by the Polish regime, continued to teach at various gymnasia and to actively support the Shevchenko Scientific Society. From 1921 to 1924, he was a professor of the Secret Ukrainian University in Lviv and was secretary of its senate. From 1934 to 1939, he taught at the Greek Catholic Theological Academy. All of his major works during this period appeared in Ukrainian and not Polish. Throughout the 1920s and 1930s, he remained active in various educational and public projects such as preserving the gravesites of fallen Ukrainian soldiers and promoting tourist literature about Ukrainian Galicia. From 1934, he was head of the Historical Section of the Shevchenko Scientific Society.

Unlike many other students of Hrushevsky, Krypiakevych never politically or intellectually rebelled against the authority of his mentor, Mykhailo Hrushevsky. Although he did turn away from Hrushevsky's populism to a pro-state interpretation of Ukrainian history, he revered his mentor's memory and in 1935 published a short biography of him.

== Soviet annexation and war ==
The 1939 fall of the Polish Republic and the Soviet annexation of Galicia brought far-reaching changes to academic as well as social and political life and Krypiakevych was appointed professor of history at the reorganized and partially Sovietized Lviv University.

The university was suppressed during the German occupation but Krypiakevych found work at the Ukrainian Publishing House in Lviv. Unlike many of his Galician Ukrainian colleagues, mostly for family reasons, he decided to remain in Lviv after the German retreat westwards.

== Soviet period ==
The return of the Soviets brought renewed repressions to the west Ukrainian intelligentsia and in 1946 Krypiakevych was deported east to Kyiv with many of his colleagues being accused in the Ukrainian bourgeois nationalism (see Soviet Union and Ukrainian bourgeois nationalism). For several years, he experienced political persecution, but in 1948, he was able to return to Lviv, and, with the help of the Soviet Ukrainian historian, Fedir Shevchenko, learned to adapt his historical writing to Soviet conditions and to the Soviet censors. From 1951, he headed the Institute of Social Sciences at the Lviv branch of the Academy of Sciences of the Ukrainian SSR. In 1958, he was elected an "Academic" of the Academy of Sciences of the Ukrainian SSR. He died in 1967 in Lviv, a respected member of the Soviet Ukrainian historical profession. Ivan Krypiakevych was buried at Lychakivskiy Cemetery, Lviv.

== Major works ==
Krypiakevych's early works dealt with the early modern history of the City of Lviv and the social history of Galicia. Thereafter, he turned to the history of the Cossacks and published his dissertation on the Báthory reforms; he then undertook further studies of the Cossacks in international politics, and then the Cossack "state" created by Bohdan Khmelnytsky in 1648. Most of these works were published in the "Memoirs of the Shevchenko Scientific Society."

During the period of Polish ascendency, Krypiakevych co-authored and published many popularizations, the most important of which were his "Great History of Ukraine" (1935), his "History of the Ukrainian Army" (1936), and his "History of Ukrainian Culture" (1937). His textbooks of Ukrainian history were widely used both in Galicia and also among Ukrainians in North America. At this time, he also prepared a new scholarly "History of Ukraine" which was only published in 1949 in the west under the pseudonym 'Ivan Kholmsky'.

During the Soviet period, Krypiakevych was known as an expert on the era of Khmelnytsky and on the occasion of the Three Hundredth Anniversary of the Treaty of Pereiaslav between the Cossacks and the Russian Tsar his "Bohdan Khmelnytsky" appeared in a very luxurious edition (1954). During the 1960s, he was very active at editing historical journals and mentoring younger Ukrainian historians, but a few years after his death in 1967, the Shelest Renaissance, which had briefly occurred under the protection of Ukrainian Communist Party leader, Petro Shelest, and had made possible so many of the cultural and academic achievements of the 1960s, came to an end (1972), and Krypiakevych's scholarly legacy was partly repressed. His monograph on the medieval Principality of Galicia-Volhynia only appeared posthumously in 1984.

== Legacy ==
With the emergence of the Gorbachev reforms and Ukrainian independence, his major works from pre-Soviet times were reprinted and uncensored editions of certain of his Soviet-era works like "Bohdan Khmelnytsky" were published. Today, he is widely revered as one of Hrushevsky's foremost students, a continuator of his tradition, and one of the most important historians of western Ukraine. The Institute of Ukrainian Studies of the National Academy of Sciences in Lviv is named in his honour.

In 1993 the Institute of Social Studies of Academy of Sciences of the UkrSSR in Lviv was renamed into the Krypiakevych Institute of Ukrainian Studies (National Academy of Sciences of Ukraine).

== Family ==
Ivan Krypiakevych had two sons who later became Ukrainian scientists.

- Petro-Bohdan (1923-1980)
- Roman (1925-1999)

== See also ==
- Artemii Dymyd
