= Transfer of Crimea to Ukraine =

Territorial transfer within the Soviet Union

Transfer of Crimea in the Soviet Union
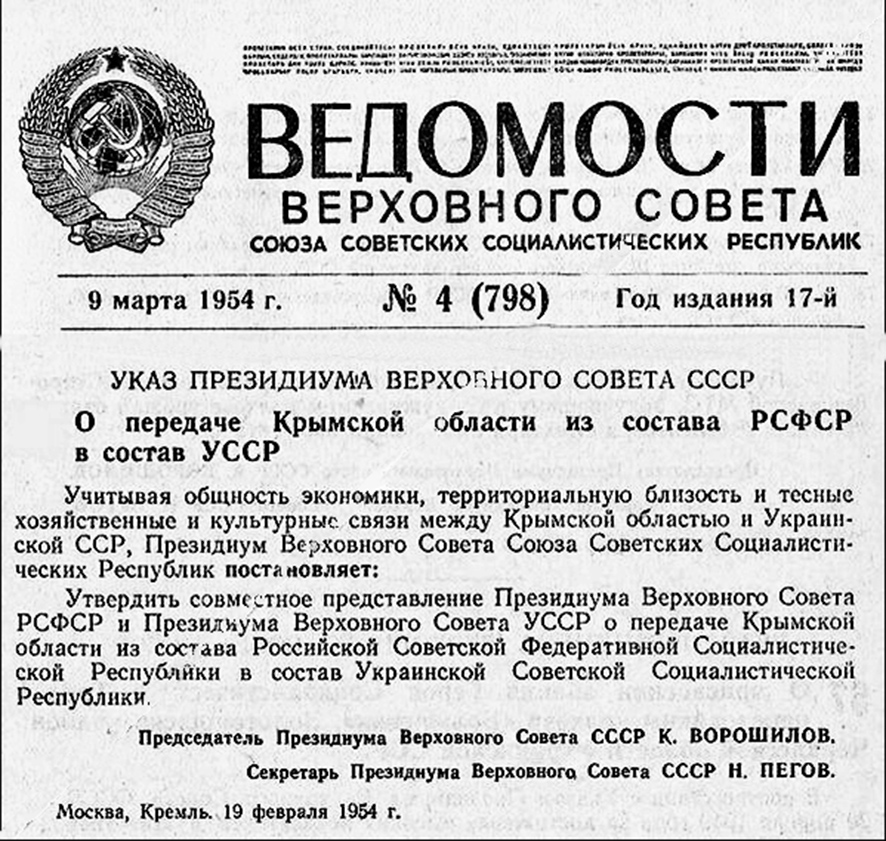
- Decree of the Presidium of the Supreme Soviet ("About the Transfer of the Crimean Oblast") on the Supreme Council Herald, 9 March 1954
- Date: 19 February 1954 – 17 June 1954
- Location: Soviet Union
- Participants: Russian SFSR; Ukrainian SSR
- Outcome: Administrative authority of the Crimean Oblast transferred to the Ukrainian SSR from the Russian SFSR

In 1954, the Presidium of the Supreme Soviet of the Soviet Union transferred the Crimean Oblast from the Russian SFSR to the Ukrainian SSR. Crimea had been recognized within the Soviet Union as having "close economic and cultural ties" to the Ukrainian SSR, and the transfer commemorated the Union of Russia and Ukraine Tercentenary (as the USSR's official historiography referred to the 1654 Pereiaslav Agreement as an "act of unification between Ukraine and Russia").

Amidst the dissolution of the Soviet Union in 1991, the Ukrainian SSR seceded from the Soviet Union and Ukraine continued to exercise sovereignty over the territory as the Autonomous Republic of Crimea. Russia recognised Crimea as being a part of Ukraine for over two decades, having signed the Belovezha Accords in 1991 as well as the Budapest Memorandum in 1994 to guarantee Ukraine's territorial integrity. But in 2014, it broke these guarantees and reverted its position when Crimea was annexed by Russia after coming under Russian military occupation.

The Soviet-era transfer of Crimea has remained a topic of contention between the two countries in light of the Russo-Ukrainian War, as the Russian government has stated that the Ukrainians must recognize Russia's sovereignty over the territory as part of any negotiated settlement to end the Russian invasion of Ukraine, which began in 2022.

== Background ==
=== Annexation of Crimea by the Russian Empire (1783) ===
Prior to being incorporated into the Russian Empire, the Crimean Peninsula was independent under the Crimean Khanate. The Muslim Turkic Crimean Tatars were under the influence of the Ottoman Empire, while also bordering the Russian Empire. In 1774, following the Russo-Turkish War of 1768–74, the Russian and Ottoman empires agreed to refrain from interfering with the Crimean Khanate through the Treaty of Küçük Kaynarca. In 1783, following the increasing decline of the Ottoman Empire, the Russian Empire annexed the Crimean Khanate.

Crimea was transferred between various internal administrations within Russia. It was governed by 14 administrations during its time in the Russian Empire and the Russian SFSR, up to its transfer to the Ukrainian SSR in 1954.

=== Deportation of Crimean Tatars by the Soviet Union ===
Throughout its time in the Soviet Union, Crimea underwent a population change. Because of alleged collaboration with the Germans by Crimean Tatars during World War II, all Crimean Tatars were deported by the Soviet regime and the peninsula was resettled with other peoples, mainly Russians and Ukrainians. Modern experts say that the deportation was part of the Soviet plan to gain access to the Dardanelles and acquire territory in Turkey, where the Tatars had Turkic ethnic kin, or to remove minorities from the Soviet Union's border regions. Nearly 8,000 Crimean Tatars died during the deportation, and tens of thousands perished subsequently due to the harsh exile conditions. The deportation resulted in the abandonment of 80,000 households and 150,000 hectares (360,000 acres) of land.

The autonomous republic without its titled nationality was downgraded to an oblast within the Russian SFSR on 30 June 1945.

== Decree ==
On 19 February 1954, the Presidium of the Supreme Soviet of the Soviet Union issued a decree transferring the Crimean Oblast from the Russian Soviet Federative Socialist Republic to the Ukrainian Soviet Socialist Republic. The documents which are now housed at the State Archive of the Russian Federation (GARF) do confirm that the move was originally approved by the Presidium (Politburo) of the Communist Party of the Soviet Union (CPSU) on 25 January 1954, paving the way for the authorizing resolution of the Presidium of the Supreme Soviet of the Soviet Union three weeks later. According to the Soviet Constitution (article 18), the borders of a republic within the Soviet Union could not be re-drawn without the agreement of the republic in question. The transfer was approved by the Presidium of the Supreme Soviet of the Soviet Union. The constitutional change (articles 22 and 23) to accommodate the transfer was made several days after the decree issued by the Presidium of the Supreme Soviet.

The decree was first announced, on the front page of Pravda, on 27 February 1954. The full text of the decree was:

On April 26, 1954 The decree of the Presidium of the USSR Supreme Soviet transferring the Crimea Oblast from the Russian SFSR to the Ukrainian SSR.

Taking into account the integral character of the economy, the territorial proximity and the close economic and cultural ties between the Crimea Province and the Ukrainian SSR, the Presidium of the USSR Supreme Soviet decrees:

To approve the joint presentation of the Presidium of the Russian SFSR Supreme Soviet and the Presidium of the Ukrainian SSR Supreme Soviet on the transfer of the Crimea Province from the Russian SFSR to the Ukrainian SSR.

Consequently, amendments were made to the republican constitutions of Russia and Ukraine. On 2 June 1954 the Supreme Soviet of Russia adopted amendments to the Russian Constitution of 1937, which, among other things, excluded Crimea from list of subdivisions enumerated in article 14, and on 17 June 1954, the Supreme Soviet of Ukraine added Crimea to article 18 of the 1937 Constitution of the Ukrainian SSR.

== Motivation ==
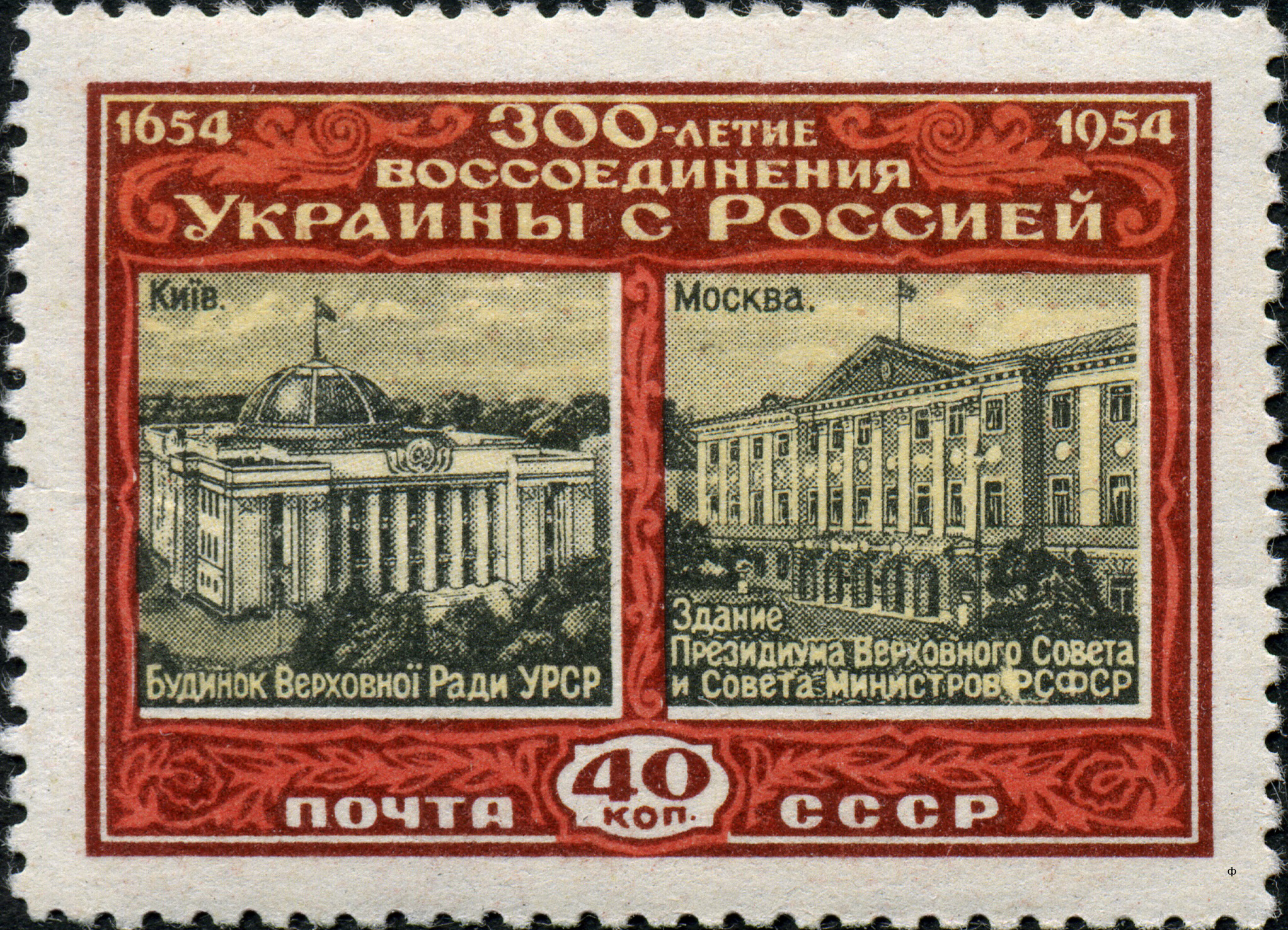
1954 Soviet propaganda stamp marking the 300th anniversary of Ukraine's reunification with Russia.

The transfer of the Crimean oblast to Ukraine has been described as a "symbolic gesture", marking the 300th anniversary of the 1654 Treaty of Pereyaslav, called the "Reunification of Ukraine with Russia" in the Soviet Union. It was also attributed to Communist Party first secretary Nikita Khrushchev, although the person who signed the document was Chairman Kliment Voroshilov, the Soviet Union's de jure head of state. The transfer had taken place on the basis of "the integral character of the economy, the territorial proximity and the close economic and cultural ties between the Crimea Province and the Ukrainian SSR" and to commemorate the 300th anniversary of Ukraine's union with Russia (also known in the Soviet Union as the Pereiaslav Agreement).

Mark Kramer, professor of Cold War Studies at Harvard University, also claimed that the transfer was partly to help Khruschev's then-precarious political position against the Prime Minister Georgii Malenkov through winning support of the First Secretary of the Communist Party of Ukraine Aleksey Kirichenko. Kramer believed that the transfer also aimed to greatly increase the number of ethnic Russians in the Ukrainian SSR which itself was going through problems integrating previous Polish territory due to organized Ukrainian nationalist resistance.

Nina Khrushcheva, a political scientist and the great-granddaughter of Nikita Khrushchev, said of his motivation, "it was somewhat symbolic, somewhat trying to reshuffle the centralized system and also, full disclosure, Nikita Khrushchev was very fond of Ukraine, so I think to some degree it was also a personal gesture toward his favorite republic. He was ethnically Russian, but he really felt great affinity with Ukraine." Sergei Khrushchev, Khrushchev's son, claimed that the decision was due to the building of a hydro-electric dam on the Dnieper river and the consequent desire for all the administration to be under one body. Since Sevastopol in Crimea was the site of the Black Sea Fleet, a quintessential element of Soviet and then of Russian foreign policy, the transfer had the intended effect of binding Ukraine inexorably to Russia, "Eternally Together", as a poster commemorating the event proclaimed. Other reasons given were the integration of the economies of Ukraine and Crimea and the idea that Crimea was a natural extension of the Ukrainian steppes. There was also a desire to repopulate parts of Crimea with Slavic peoples, mainly Russians and Ukrainians, after the peninsula was subject to large-scale deportations of Crimean Tatars to Central Asia by the Soviet regime in 1944. Sergey Minchik, the grandson of Dmitry Polyansky, who headed Crimea from 1952 to 1955, writes that Khrushchev decided to transform Russia's borders in order to "pacify" a suffering Ukraine and to start his reform of restructuring the USSR along the lines of the United States, which has no national regions.

== Aftermath ==
The transfer increased the ethnic Russian population of Ukraine by almost a million people. Prominent Russian politicians such as Alexander Rutskoy considered the transfer to be controversial.

In January 1992, following Ukrainian independence, the Supreme Soviet of Russia questioned the constitutionality of the transfer, accusing Nikita Khrushchev of treason against the Russian people and said that the transfer was illegitimate. Alexander Rutskoy, the former Vice President of Russia, said that this was a "harebrained scheme", and that those who signed the document must have been suffering from sunstroke or hangovers.

There was confusion about the status of Sevastopol and whether it was a part of the transfer as it had a degree of independence from the Crimean Oblast and never formally ratified the transfer, although it was later mentioned as Ukrainian territory in the Soviet Constitution and the Belovezha Accords between Ukraine and Russia.

In 1994, a Russian nationalist administration under Yuriy Meshkov took over in Crimea with the promise to return Crimea to Russia, although these plans were later shelved. In a 1997 treaty between the Russian Federation and Ukraine, Russia recognized Ukraine's borders, and accepted Ukraine's sovereignty over Crimea.

== Question of constitutionality ==
On 27 June 2015, after the annexation of Crimea by the Russian Federation, the Prosecutor General of Russia accepted the request of the leader of A Just Russia party, Sergey Mironov, to evaluate the legitimacy of 1954 transfer of Crimea and stated that the transfer violated both the Russian Soviet Federative Socialist Republic and the Constitution of the Soviet Union.

Mark Kramer, director of Cold War Studies at Harvard University, argued that Proceedings of the USSR Supreme Soviet Presidium meeting indicated that the parliaments of both the Russian SFSR and the Ukrainian SSR had given their consent to the transfer of Crimea, and so had complied with Article 18 of the Soviet Constitution, which stated that "the territory of a Union Republic may not be altered without its consent." Additionally, Kramer disputed the relevance of questioning the transfer's constitutionality by stating that the "legal system in the Soviet Union was mostly a fiction," and that the Russian Federation recognised Crimea as being a part of Ukraine in 1991 in the Belovezha Accords, as well as in 1994 in the Budapest Memorandum.

== See also ==
- North Crimean Canal
- History of Crimea
- Crimea in the Soviet Union
