= Union of Russia and Ukraine Tercentenary =

300-year commemoration in Soviet Russia and Ukraine

The Union of Russia and Ukraine Tercentenary or the Reunification of Ukraine with Russia Tercentenary (Russian: 300-летие воссоединения Украины с Россией, 300-letiye vossoyedineniya Ukrainy s Rossiyei; Ukrainian: 300-річчя возз'єднання України з Росією) was a republic-wide celebration within the Soviet republics of Russia and Ukraine, starting in February 1954, in celebration of the union between Russia and Ukraine formed by the 1654 Pereiaslav Agreement.

In preparation for the event, a special Republican commission for commemoration of the union between Russia and Ukraine Tercentenary was formed, headed by the First Secretary of the Communist Party of Ukraine Alexei Kirichenko. A three-volume body of documents and materials titled as "Reunification of Ukraine with Russia" was published in 1953 in Moscow, prepared jointly by the History Institute of the Academy of Sciences of the Soviet Union, History Institute of the Academy of Sciences of the Ukrainian SSR, and the Ukrainian Directorate of Archives, and included 747 documents of the period between 1620 and 1654. The materials were prepared by a group of Soviet Russian and Ukrainian historians organized in 1952 and approved by the Central Committee of the Communist Party of the Soviet Union.

As part of the celebration, the Crimean Oblast was transferred from the Russian SFSR to the Ukrainian SSR in 1954. In 1954, both Dnipropetrovsk State University and Cherkasy Pedagogical Institute were named after the Union of Russia and Ukraine Tercentenary. Also, several cities were renamed including Proskuriv as Khmelnytskyi and Pereyaslav as Pereiaslav-Khmelnytskyi in honor of Bogdan Khmelnytsky. Full-scale parades were organized in Moscow and Kiev. It was a period when television broadcasting in the Soviet Union was just beginning, so most of the celebration was being broadcast on radio.

The Russian aspirations to reunite with Ukraine is one of the main subjects in the Soviet historiography. According to the Ukrainian Soviet Encyclopedia, in the 18th century there were no partitions of Poland, but rather reunification of Ukrainian lands (Right-bank Ukraine).

== Gallery ==
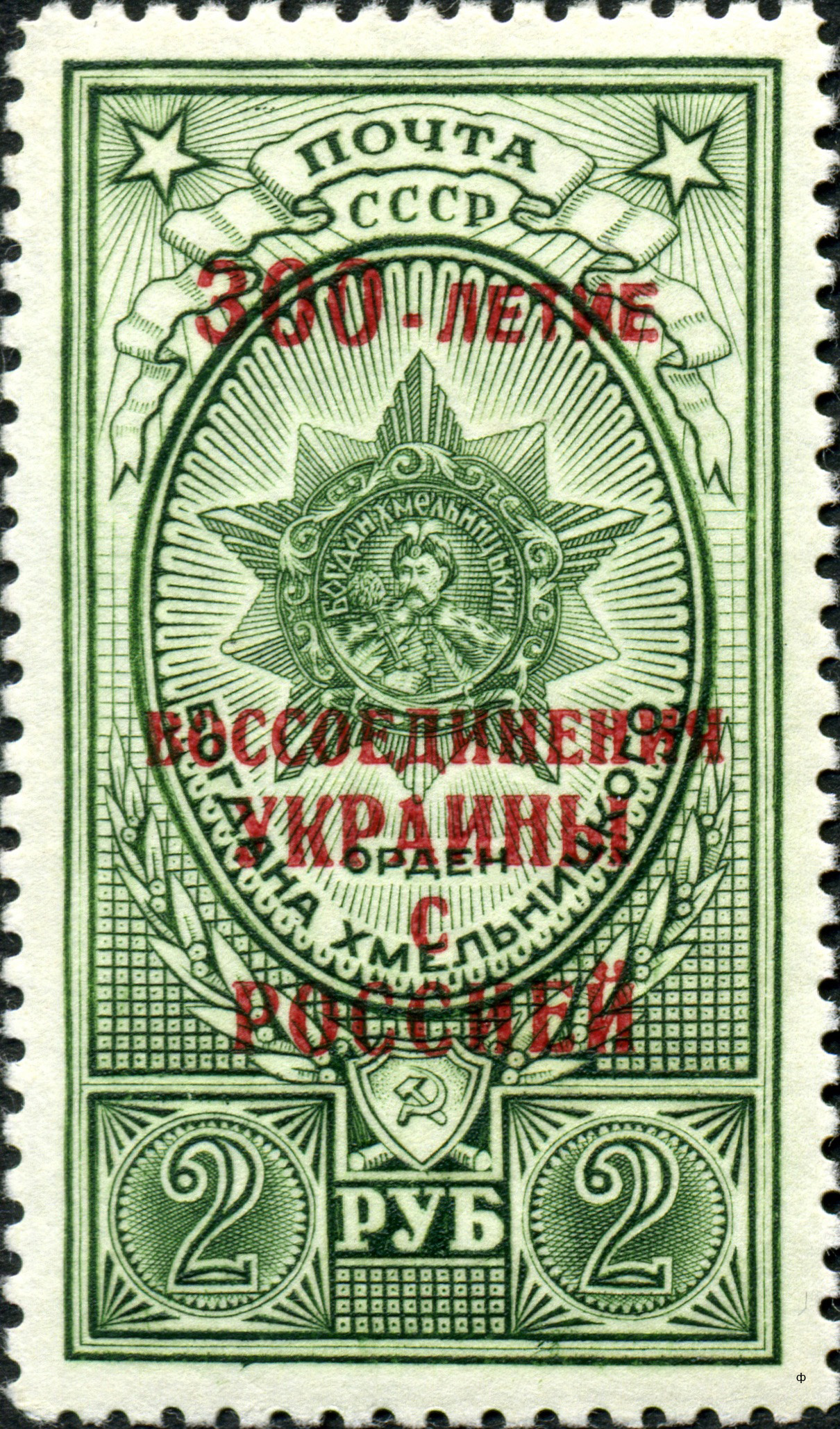
Soviet stamp of 2 rubles (1954)

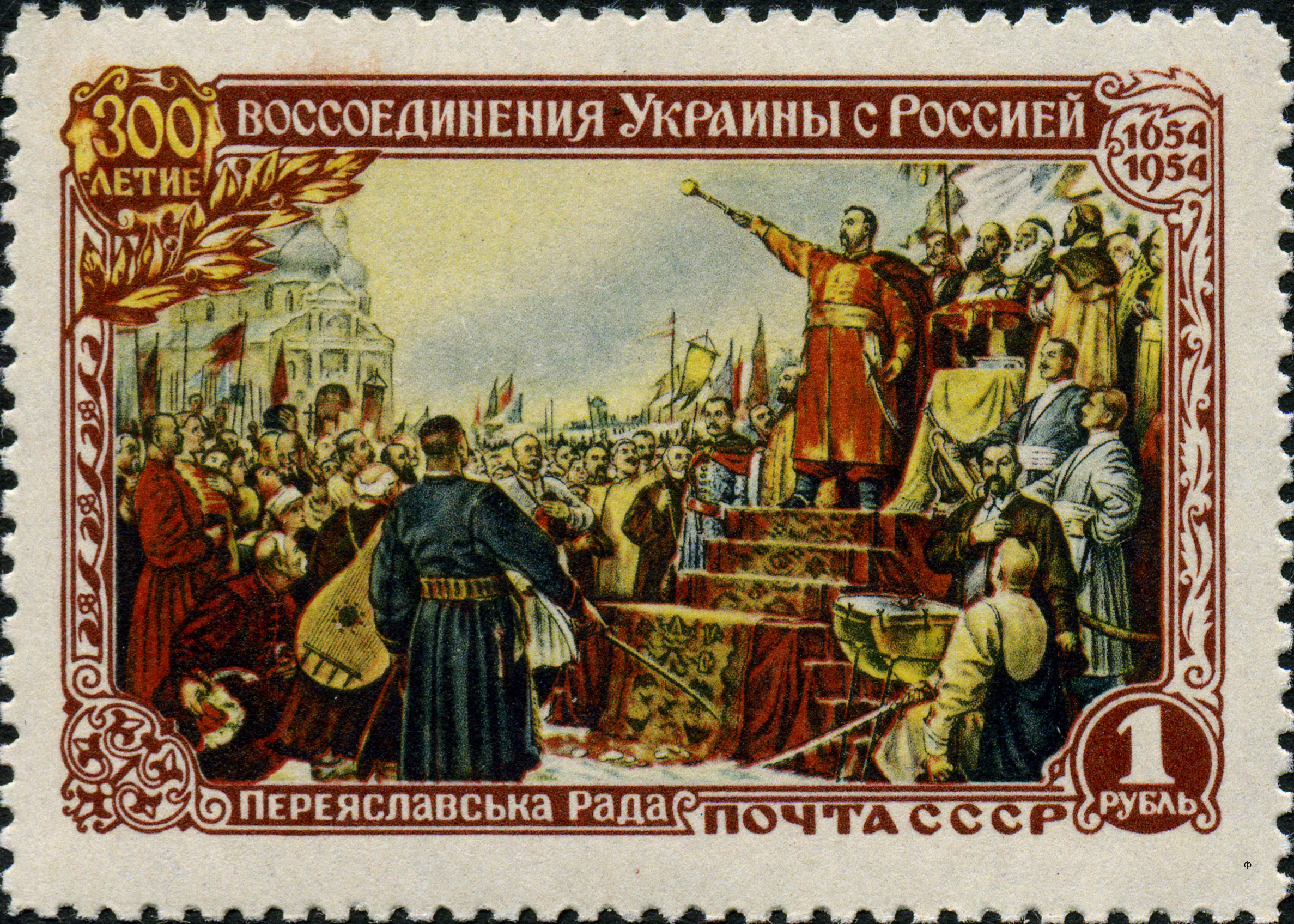
Soviet stamp of 1 ruble (1954)

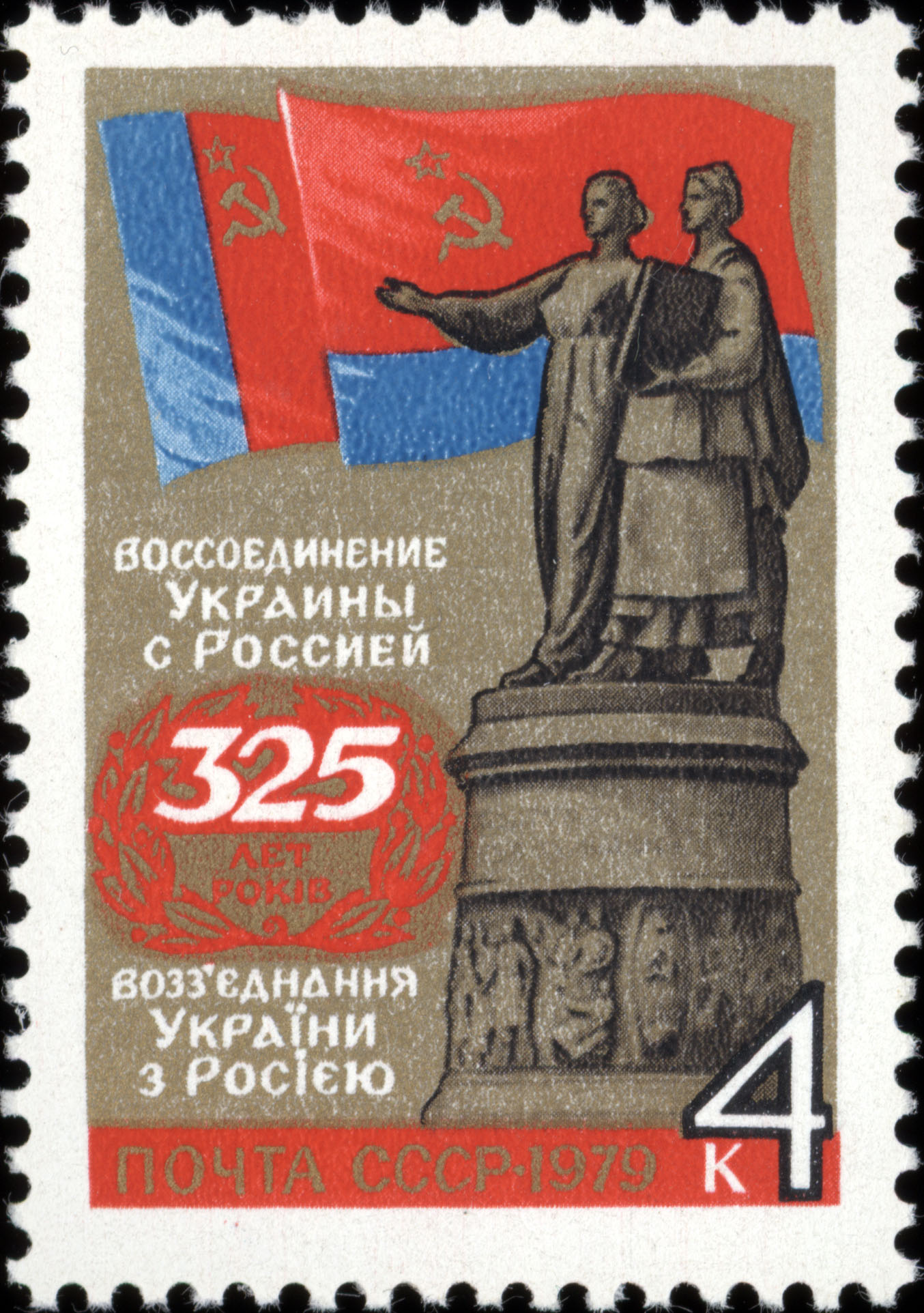
Soviet stamp of 4 kopecks (1979)

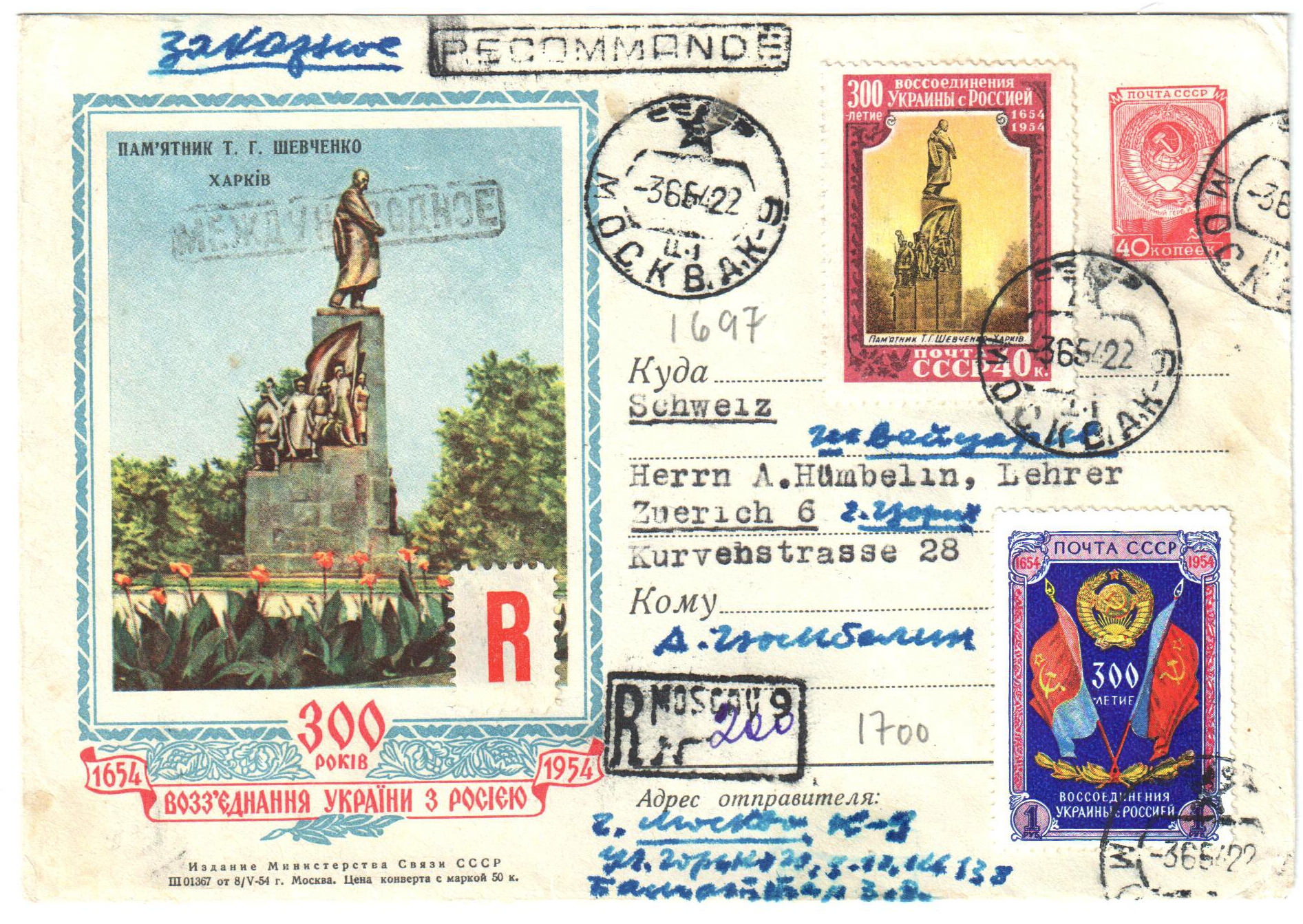
The 1954 envelope with additional Soviet stamps

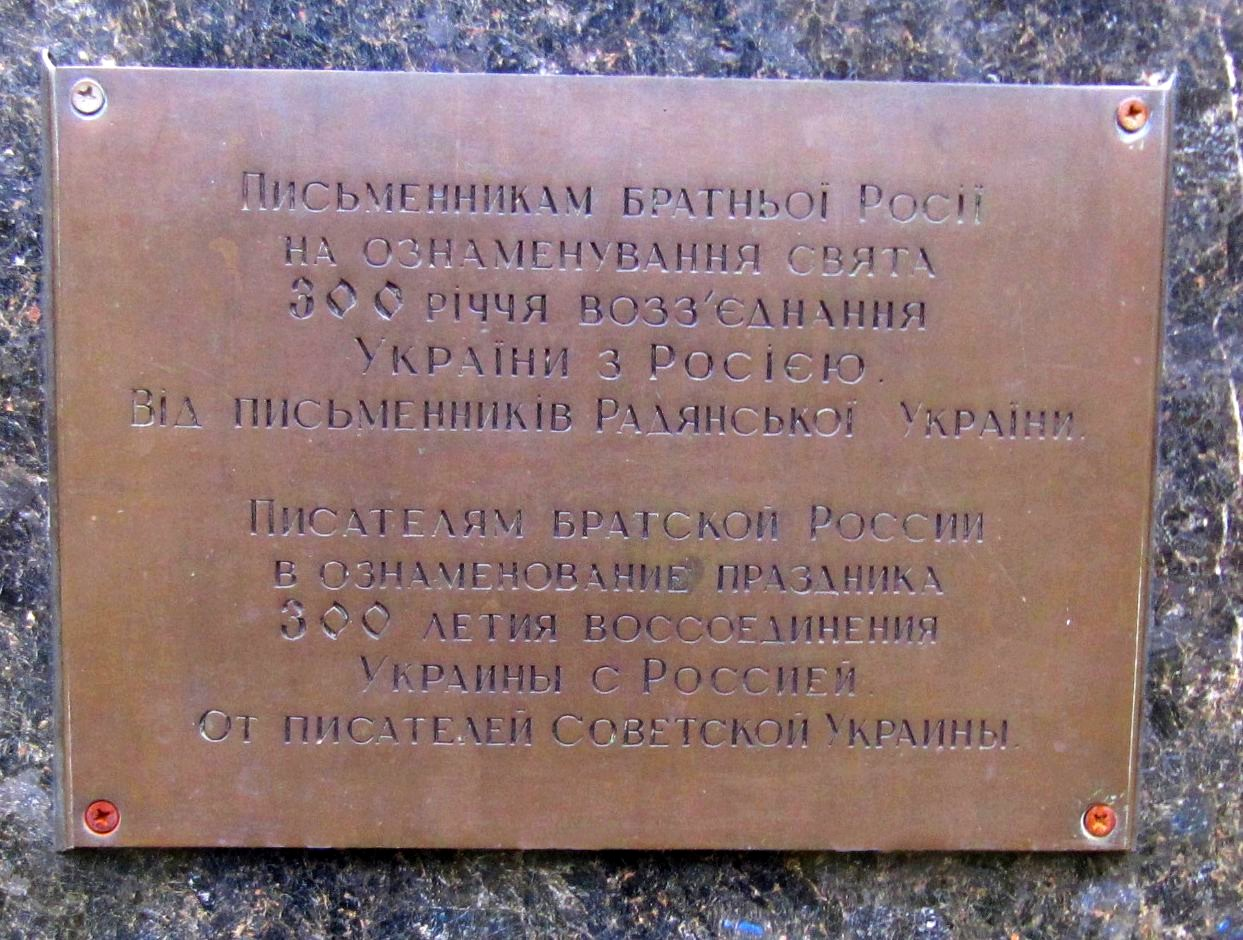
Soviet commemorating placard on monument of Lev Tolstoy
