= Artemii Dymyd =

Ukrainian public activist (1995–2022)

- Артемій Димид
- Born: Artemii-Yulian Mykhailovych Dymyd; 4 July 1995; Lviv, Ukraine
- Died: 18 June 2022 (aged 26); Bila Krynytsia, Mykolaiv Oblast, Ukraine
- Education: Ukrainian Catholic University
- Military career
- Allegiance: Ukraine
- Branch: Armed Forces of Ukraine
- Rank: Able seaman
- Nickname: Kurka (Курка)
- Conflicts: Russo-Ukrainian War
- Awards: Order for Courage

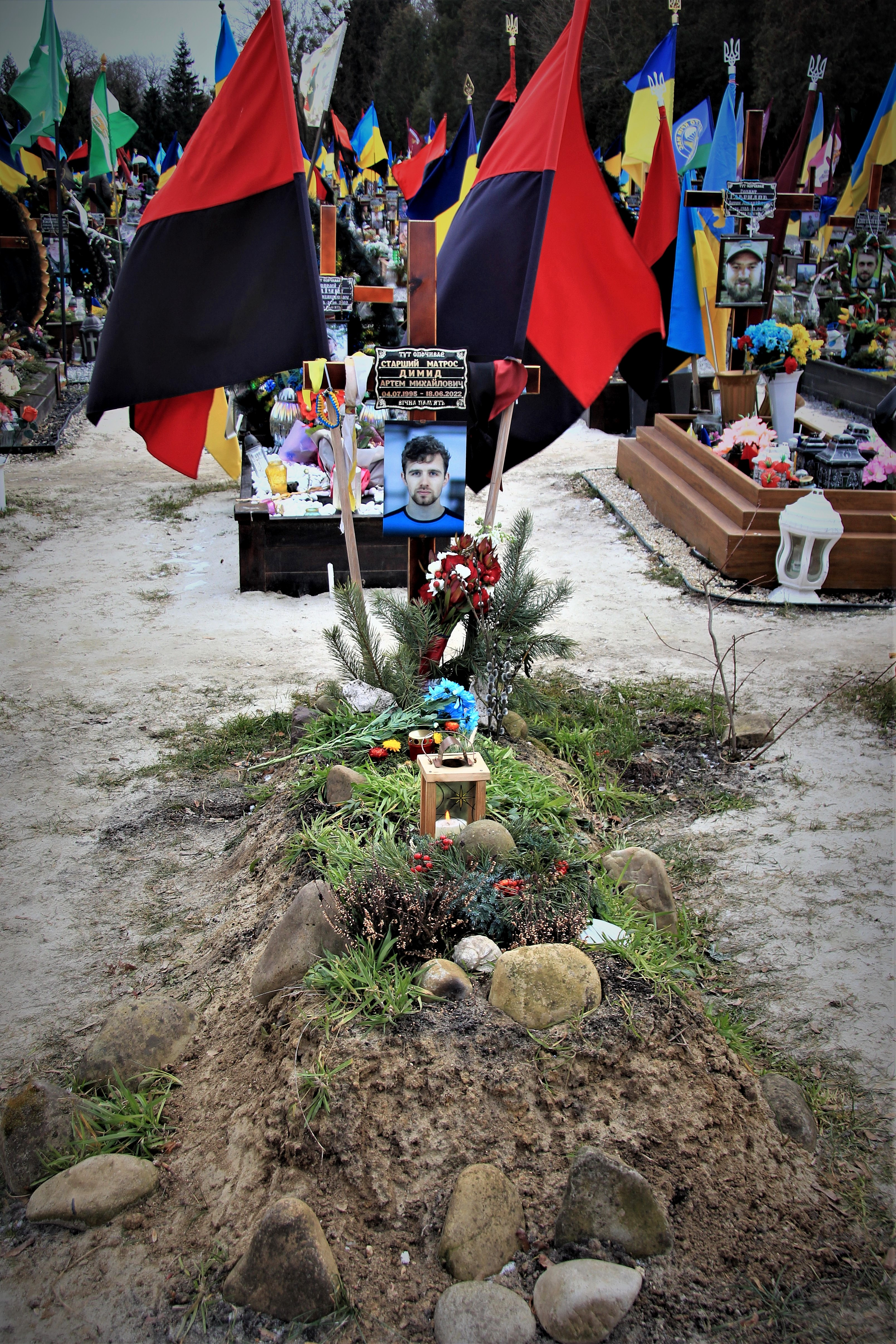
Grave of Artemii Dymyd

Artemii-Yulian Mykhailovych Dymyd (Ukrainian: Артемій-Юліан Михайлович Димид; 4 July 1995, Lviv – 18 June 2022, Bila Krynytsia, Mykolaiv Oblast) was a Ukrainian public activist, scout, traveler, parachutist, participant of the Revolution of Dignity, serviceman, able seaman of the Armed Forces of Ukraine, participant of the Russian-Ukrainian war.

Son of icon painter Ivanna Krypiakevych-Dymyd and the first rector of the Ukrainian Catholic University, chaplain of the Maidan, Father Mykhailo Dymyd, great-grandson of Ukrainian historian Ivan Krypiakevych and underground priest Artemii Tsehelskyi.

== Biography ==
Artemiy Dymyd was born on 4 July 1995 in Lviv.

He studied at an academic gymnasium and a physics and mathematics lyceum in Lviv. He graduated from the Faculty of Historical Sciences of the Ukrainian Catholic University.

From the age of seven, he was a member and teacher of the Ukrainian scouting organization Plast. He grew up in Bohdan Khmelnytsky's kuren number 69. He was a kurennyk, educator, member of the 15th kuren of the Order of the Iron Ostroh.

Participant of the Revolution of Dignity. At the beginning of the Russian-Ukrainian war, he volunteered for a separate special forces unit "Azov", with which he participated in battles near Shyrokyne. Later, he was transferred to the Harpoon Special Forces Battalion. After demobilization, he was actively engaged in self-development and traveling.

With the beginning of the Russian invasion of Ukraine, on 1 March 2022, he returned from Brazil, where he had parachuted from the statue of Christ the Redeemer. Artemii replaced his American Harley-Davidson motorcycle with an assault rifle, bought a bulletproof vest and helmet in the United States, and flew to Poland to reach Ukraine by bus. When the stewardess asked him why he was wearing a bulletproof vest, he replied: "I'm from Ukraine, it makes me feel safer." After arriving, he went to defend the capital, but ended up in Berdychiv at the 142nd SSO training center. He served alongside the traveler Viktor-Mykola Havryliuk, his friend Dmytro Pashchuk (died on 12 March 2023), and MP Roman Lozynskyi. They jokingly called their four in the war the "Hawaiian TRO". They fought in the Kherson sector.

He died on 18 June 2022, as a result of mortar shelling during a combat mission in the village of Bila Krynytsia, Mykolaiv Oblast.

On June 21, 2022, the funeral service at the Saints Peter and Paul Garrison Church in Lviv was led by Bishop Volodymyr Hrutsa. During the funeral, Artemii's mother Ivanka Krypiakevych-Dymyd sang her son's last lullaby. He was buried at Lychakiv Cemetery on the field of honorary burials.

He was fond of extreme sports: skydiving, skiing, and hiking. He also visited 50 countries.

== Awards ==
- Order for Courage, 3rd class (25 May 2023, posthumously)
- Iron Plast Cross (2022, posthumously)

== Honoring ==
On the initiative of the family, the Artemii Dymyd scholarship fund was established at the Ukrainian Catholic University.
