= Vasiliy Buturlin =

Russian military leader and diplomat (died 1656)

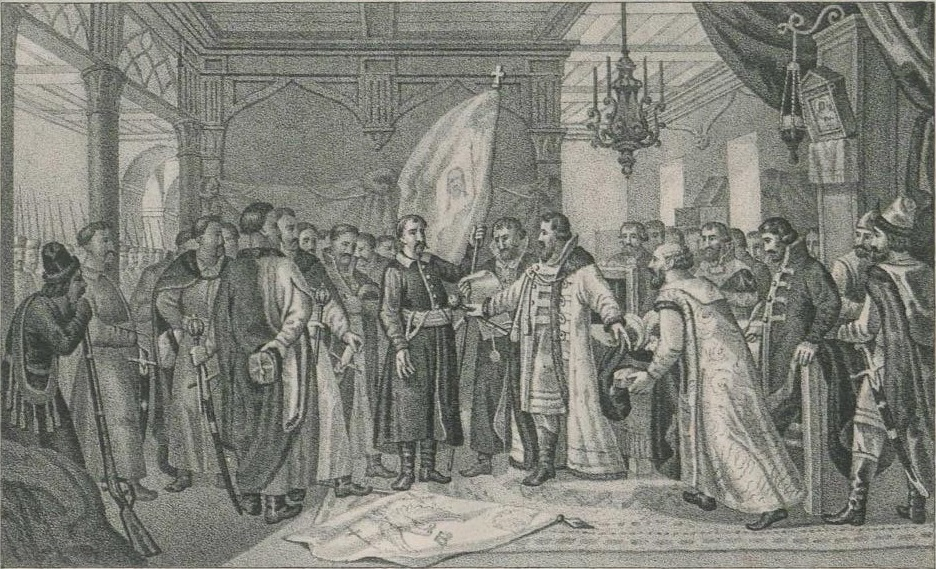
Boyar Buturlin receiving an oath of loyalty to the Russian Tsar from Bogdan Khmelnitsky.

Vasiliy Vasilyevich Buturlin (Died 1656) was a noble (boyar) Muscovite military leader and diplomat. He is better known for serving as a Muscovite envoy during negotiations with Bohdan Khmelnytskyi in Pereyaslav in 1654. Next year Buturlin successfully led Muscovite expeditionary forces against Stanisław "Rewera" Potocki and assisting Cossack army of Bohdan Khmelnytsky. In December of the same year Buturlin was recalled by the Muscovite government and died on the way back to Moscow.
