= Shelest =

Shelest (Cyrillic: Шелест) or Szelest is a gender-neutral Slavic surname. It may refer to:

- Petro Shelest (1908–1996), Ukrainian statesman
- Anatoli Shelest (born 1955), Russian football coach and a former player
- Oleksiy Shelest (born 1973), Ukrainian race walker
- Taras Shelest (born 1980), Russian football player, son of Anatoli
- Stan Szelest (1942–1991), American musician
