= Mark Kramer (journalist) =

American journalist and professor Mark Kramer

- Born: Mark William Kramer; Brooklyn, New York, U.S.
- Education: Brandeis University, B.A. (English and Sociology); Columbia University, M.S. (Sociology)
- Occupations: Journalist, Author, Professor, Editor
- Years active: 1969-present
- Children: 2
- Website: tellingtruestories.com

Mark William Kramer is an American journalist, author, professor, and editor.

== Career ==
Mark Kramer is the author of four books of narrative journalism, and has written for National Geographic, The New York Times Magazine, and The Atlantic monthly. He is the co-editor of two textbooks in the field of narrative journalism. He was the founding director of the Nieman program on narrative Journalism at the Nieman Foundation for Journalism at Harvard University, and the power of narrative conference (1998–2008). He has been writer in residence at Smith College (1980–1990) and Boston University (1990–2001).

== Publications ==
- Travels With a Hungry Bear: a Journey to the Russian Heartland Houghton Mifflin, 1996 ISBN 9780395426708
- Mother Walter and the Pig Tragedy Knopf, 1972 ISBN 9780394479545
- Three Farms: Making Milk, Meat, and Money from the American Soil Atlantic/Little Brown, 1980; Bantam, 1981; Harvard University Press, 1987 ISBN 9780316503150
- Invasive Procedures: A Year in the World of Two Surgeons. Harper & Row, 1982; Penguin, 1983 ISBN 9780060151607
- Literary Journalism. Ballantine, 1995 ISBN 9780345382221
- Telling True Stories: A Nonfiction Writer's Guide from the Nieman Foundation at Harvard University. Plume/Penguin, 2007 ISBN 9780452287556
