= Volodymyr monument =

Volodymyr monument may refer to:

- Monument to Prince Volodymyr, Kyiv
- Statue of Saint Volodymyr, London
- Monument to Vladimir the Great, Moscow
