= Monument to Magdeburg Rights (Kyiv) =

Monument in Kyiv, Ukraine

Coordinates: 50°27′21.63″N 30°31′46.11″E

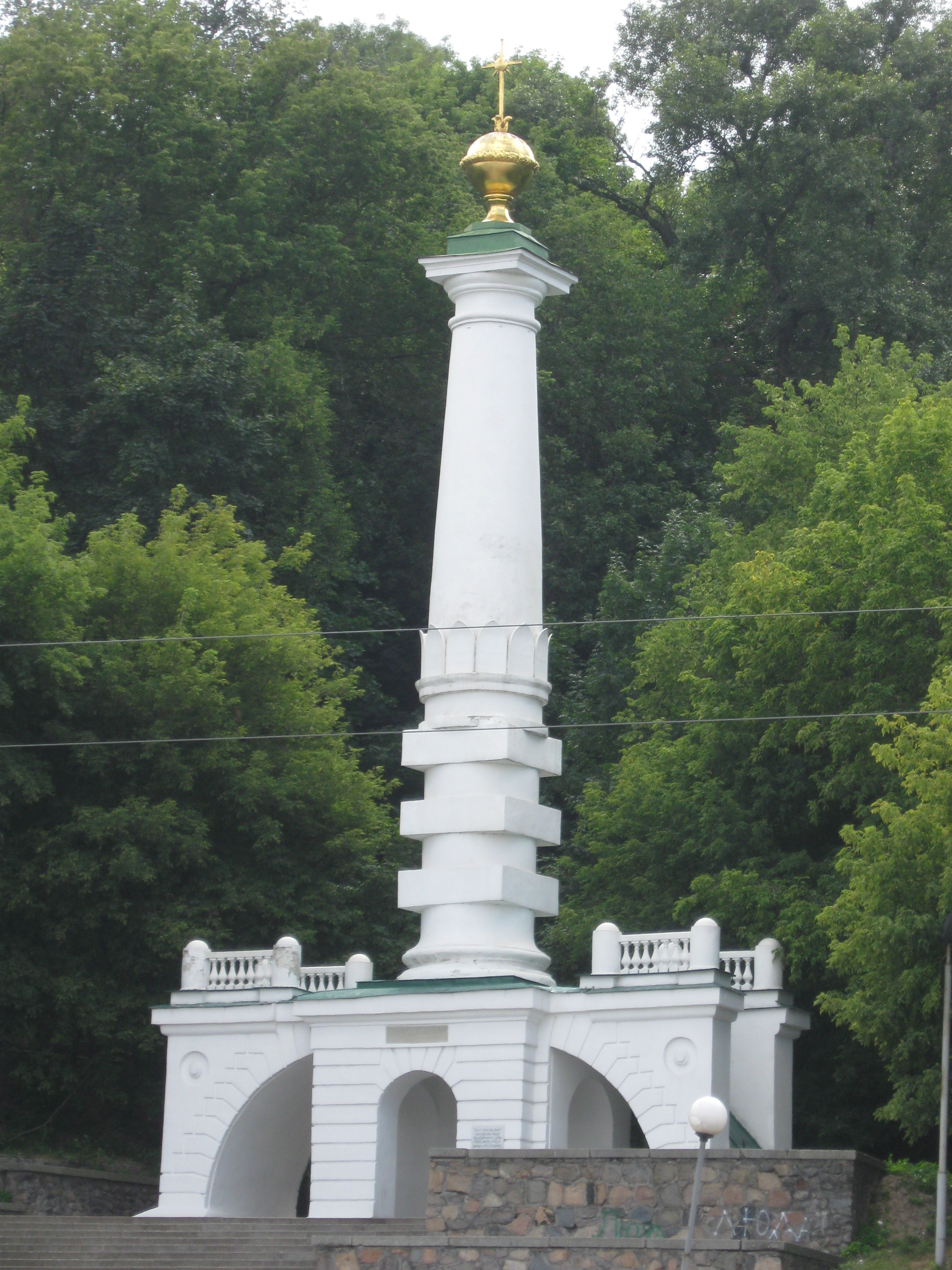
- Interactive map of Monument to Magdeburg Rights

Immovable Monument of National Significance of Ukraine
- Official name: Монумент на честь надання м. Києву Магдебурзького права (Monument commemorating the granting of Magdeburg Rights to Kyiv)
- Type: History
- Reference no.: 260035-Н

The Monument to the Magdeburg Rights (Ukrainian: Пам'ятник Маґдебурзькому праву, romanized: Pamiatnyk Magdeburzkomu pravu) is a monument commemorating the return to Kyiv of its Magdeburg rights, which granted its right to self-government. It is located in Podil Raion, Kyiv, at the foothills of the historical St. Michael's Hill, next to the Naberezhne Highway. It is considered to be the city's oldest monument. It is also called the Column of the Magdeburg Rights, the Baptizing of Ruthenia Monument, and the Lower Monument of the Saint Volodymyr. It is a scenic spot overlooking the Dnipro river, popular for local baptisms.

== History ==
The monument was erected in 1802 to commemorate the return of Magdeburg rights which were first granted back in the 15th century by Alexander Jagiellon. The city's residents celebrated this event for three days with illumination and dance, and later collected 10,000 rubles for the construction of a chapel and a monument with a fountain. The monument's author was the Kyiv architect Andrey Melensky. The brick pavilion over a spring was consecrated on August 15, 1802. Since 1804 the Metropolitan Serapion started crucessions to the monument for the blessing of the water. It is the place where Saint Volodymyr of Kyiv baptized his sons into the Christian faith.

== Gallery ==
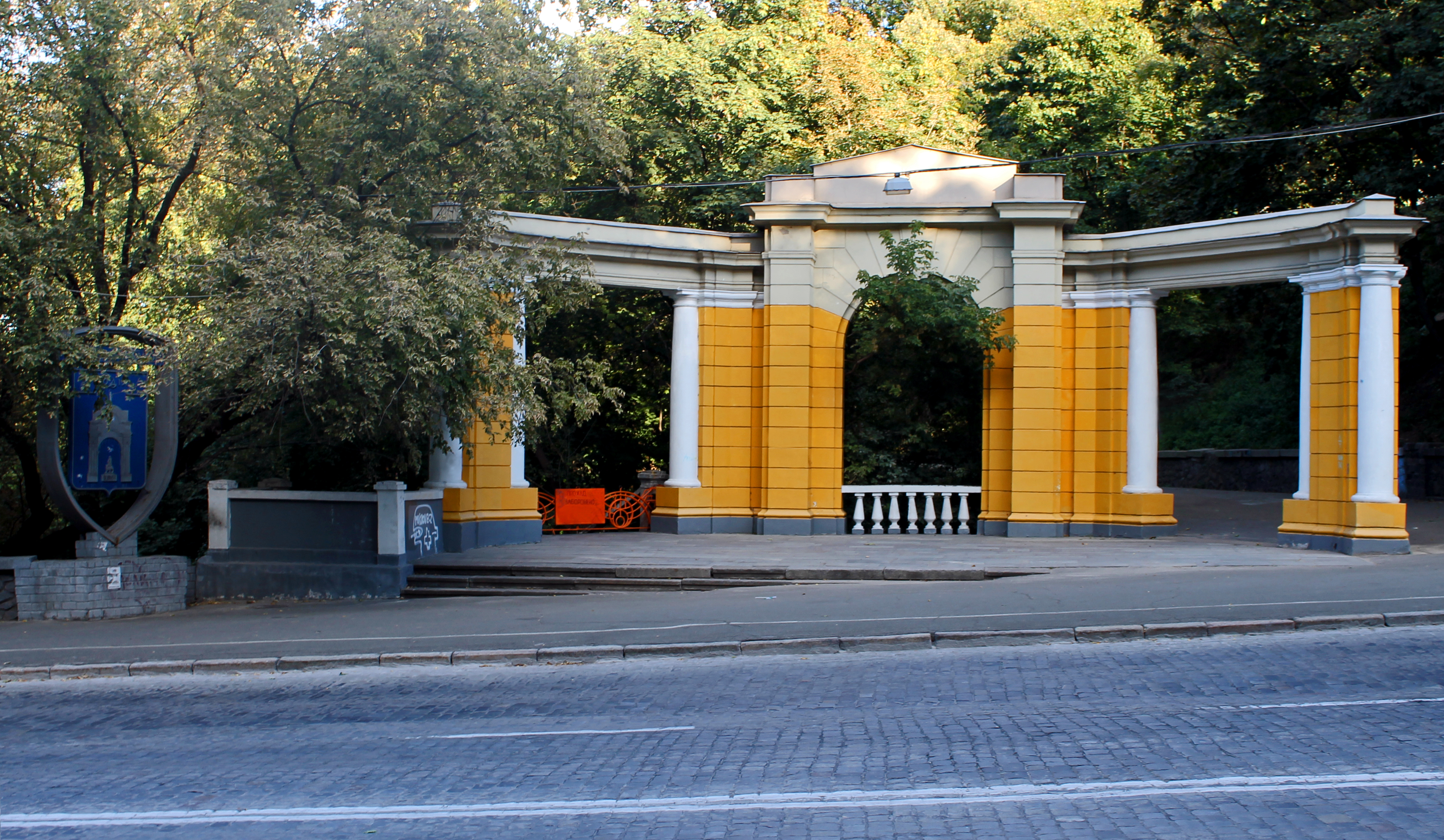
Staircase entrance at Volodymyrsky Descent

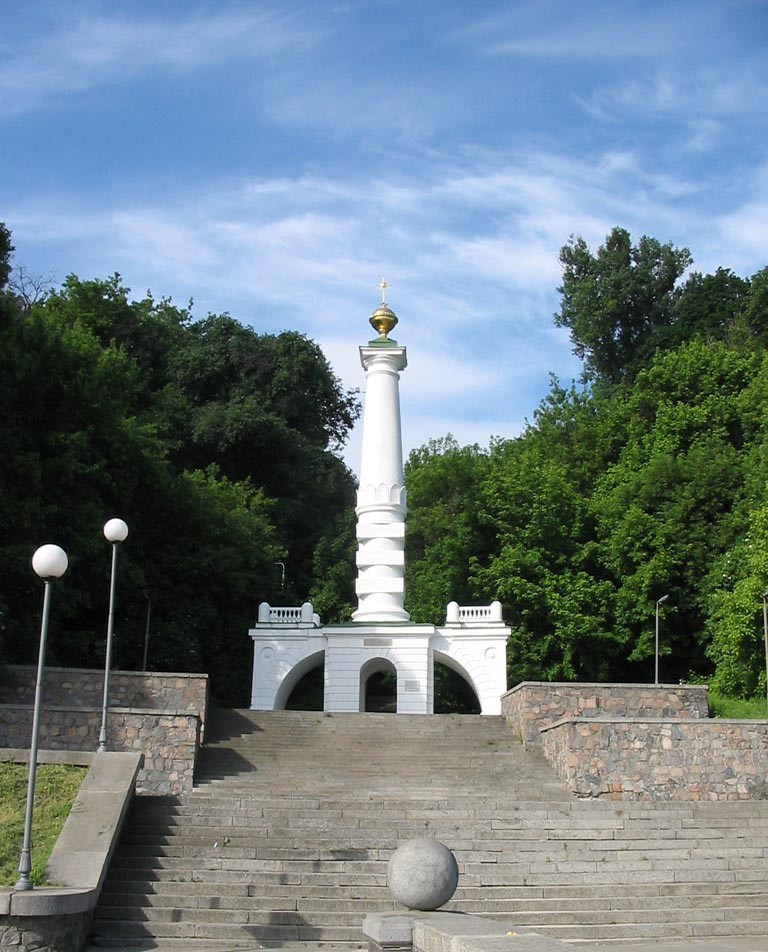
Monument to Magdeburg Rights in Kyiv

== See also ==
- Christianization of Kyivan Rus
- Independence Monument, Kyiv
- Monument to Prince Volodymyr
