= Monument to Vladimir the Great =

- Па́мятник Влади́миру Вели́кому
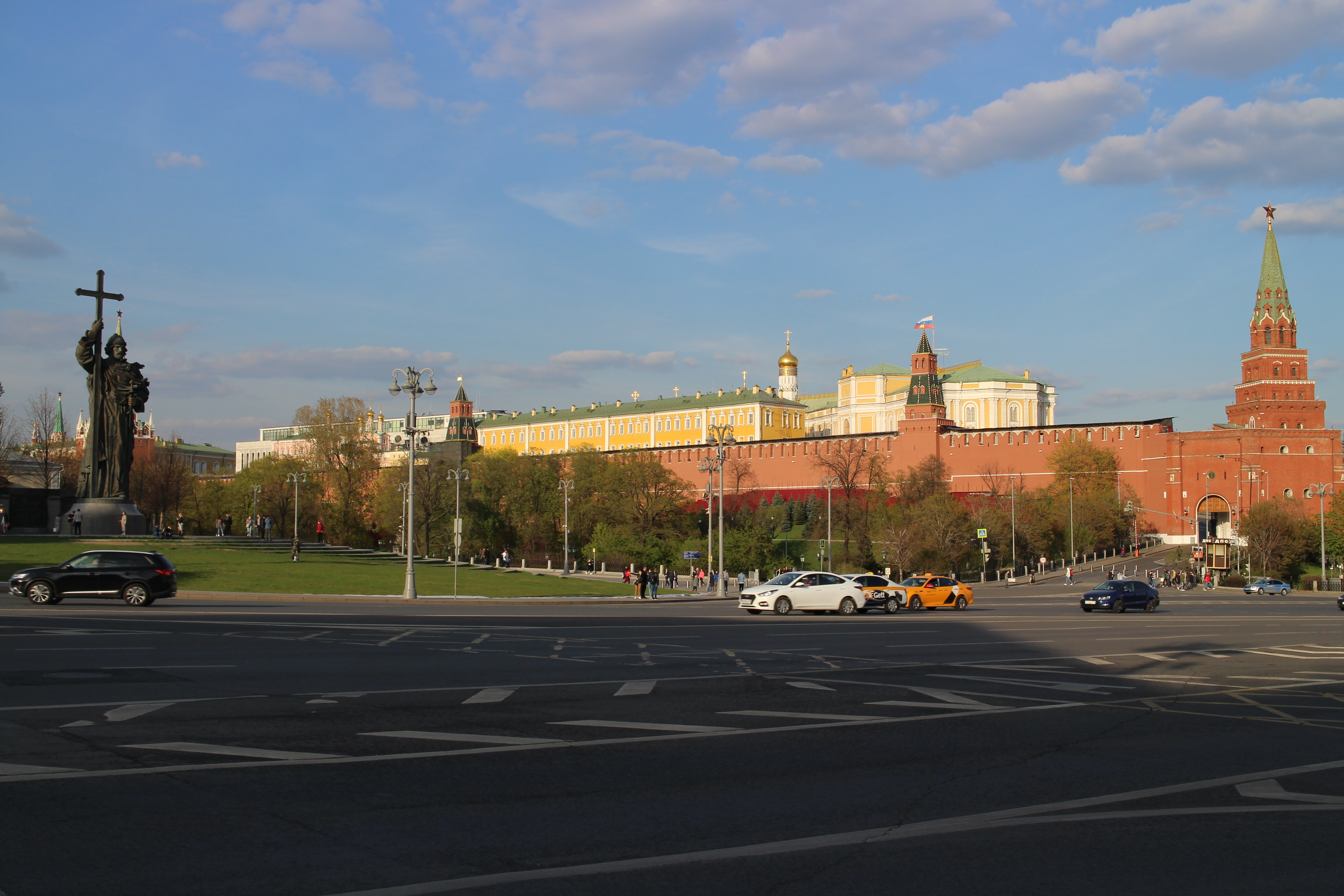
- Interactive map of Monument to Vladimir the Great
- Location: Borovitskaya Square, Moscow, Russia
- Height: 17.5 m (57 ft 5 in)
- Opening date: 4 November 2016
- Dedicated to: Vladimir the Great

The Monument to Vladimir the Great (Russian: Па́мятник Влади́миру Вели́кому) is a 17.5-metre-high monument to Vladimir the Great, located in Borovitskaya Square in central Moscow. It was designed by the designer Salavat Scherbakov on the initiative of the Russian Military Historical Society and the city government. The opening ceremony was held on 4 November 2016.

The Monument to Vladimir the Great is considerably larger than the monuments to Patriarch Hermogenes and Alexander I, which are located nearby, in Alexandrovsky garden. But it is, for example, considerably inferior to the monument "In honour of the 300th anniversary of the Russian fleet", whose height is 98 metres.

During polemics, there were fears that its erection, along with other construction work in the protection zone of the Moscow Kremlin and on its territory, puts the Kremlin under danger of being removed from the UNESCO World Heritage List, but as the Minister of Culture later stated, the reports on the erection of the monument, sent to UNESCO, fully satisfied the organization.

== Gallery ==
Opening ceremony of the monument to Vladimir the Great in Moscow

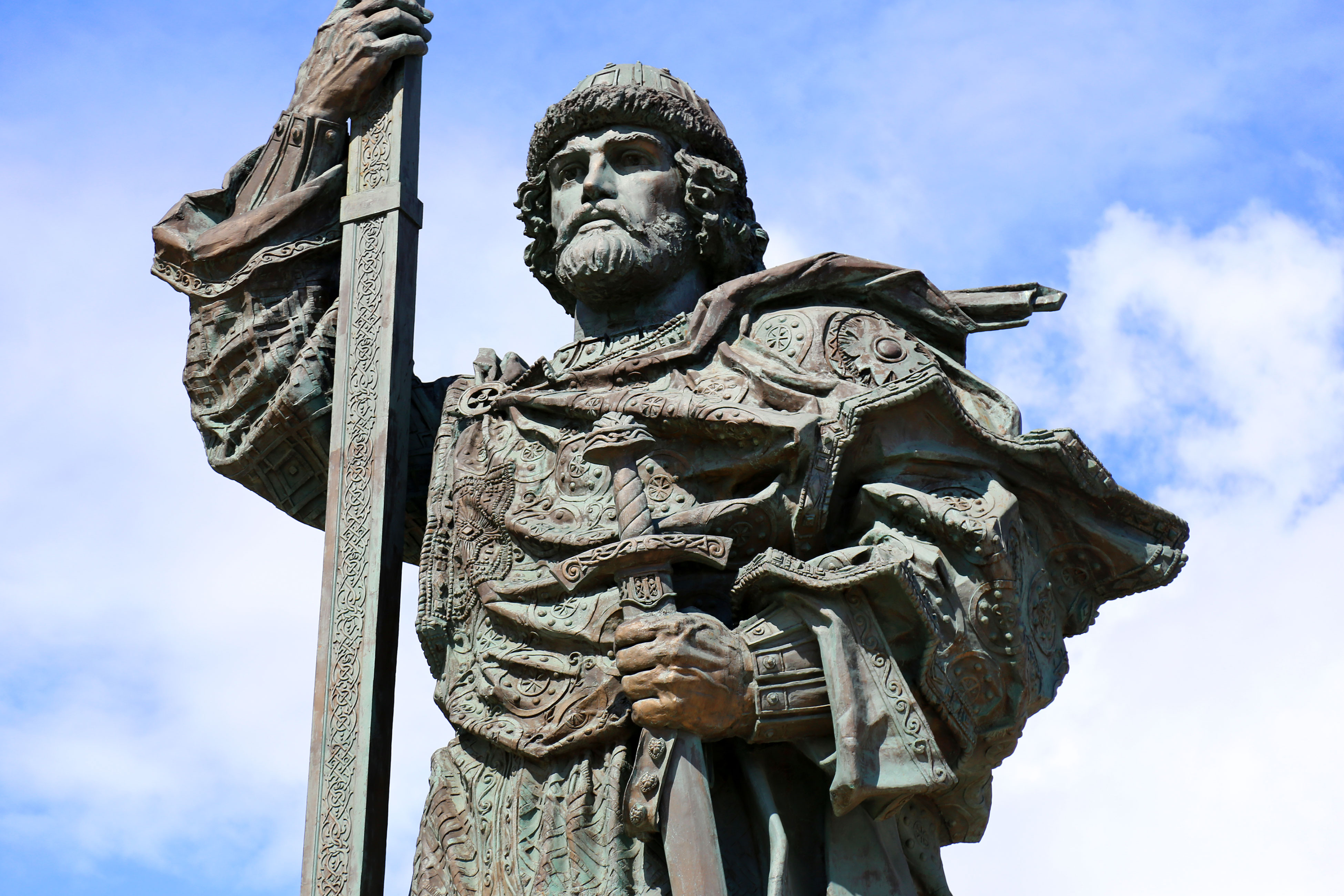
Monument to Vladimir the Great, Moscow, Russia

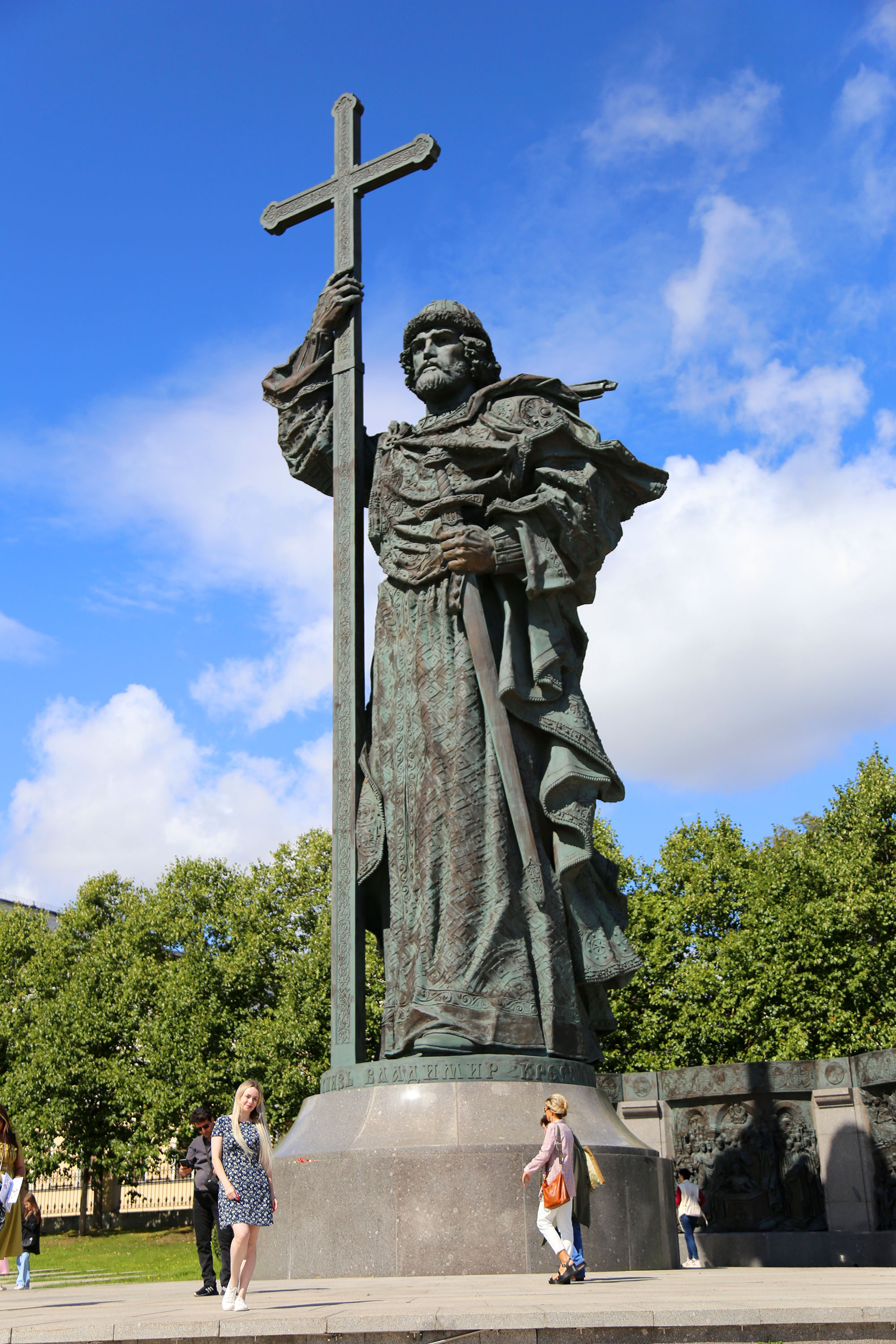
Monument to Vladimir the Great, Moscow, Russia

== See also ==
- Saint Vladimir Monument in Kyiv
- Statue of Saint Volodymyr, London
