= Statue of Saint Volodymyr, London =

Sculpture by Leo Mol

Statue of Saint Volodymyr
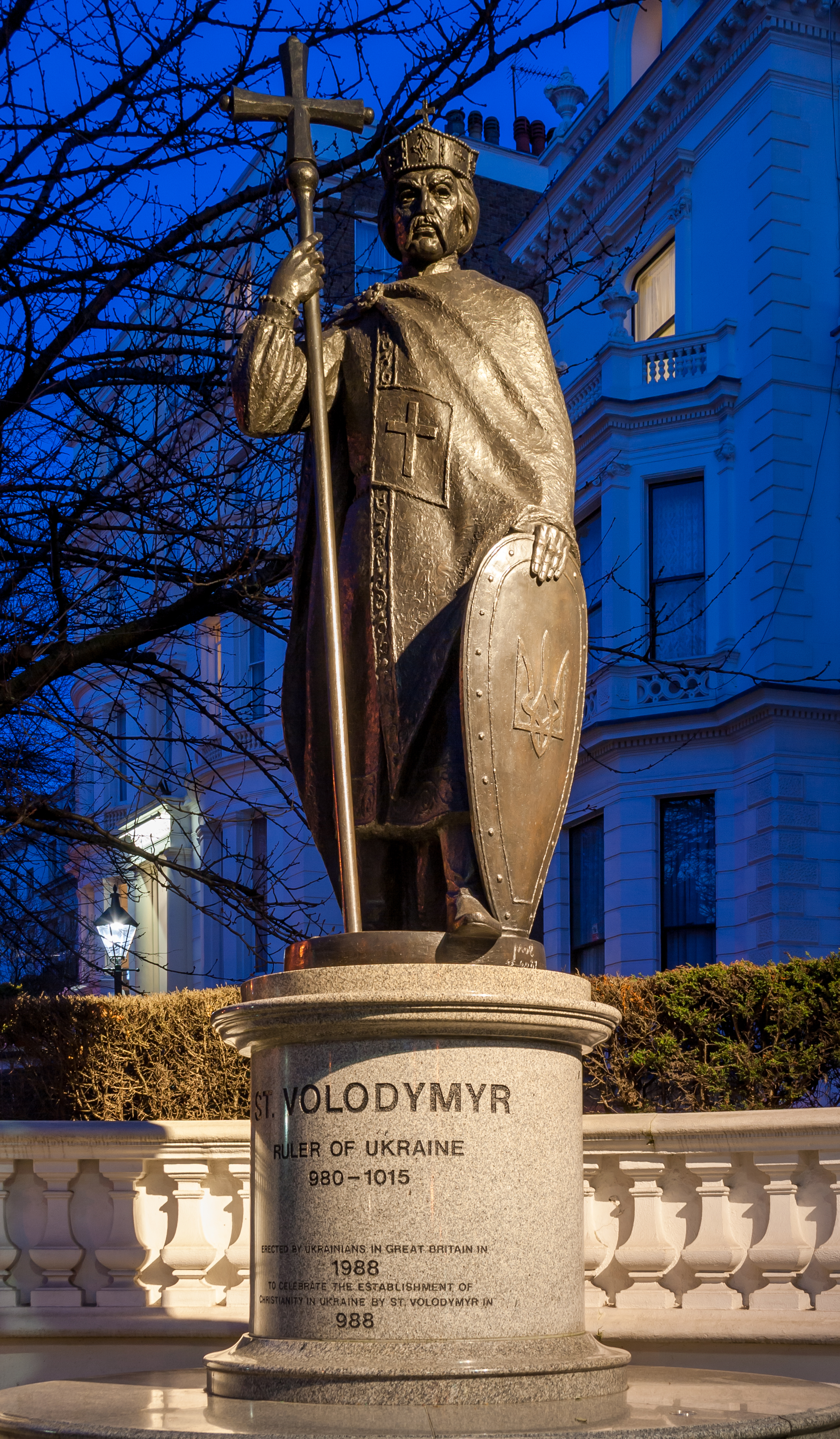
- Artist: Leo Mol
- Year: 1988
- Medium: Bronze (statue) and granite (plinth)
- Location: Holland Park; London

The statue of Saint Volodymyr in Holland Park, London, England, is a work of 1988 by the Canadian-Ukrainian sculptor Leo Mol. The bronze statue stands on the corner of Holland Park and Holland Park Avenue. It was unveiled on 29 May 1988, to commemorate the 1,000th anniversary of the Christianisation of Kievan Rus'. Later that year, another statue of Volodymyr by the same sculptor was erected in Rome.

== See also ==
- Embassy of Ukraine, London, nearby in Holland Park
- Monument to Prince Volodymyr in Kyiv
- Monument to Vladimir the Great in Moscow

== Bibliography ==
- Blackwood, John (1989). London's Immortals: The Complete Outdoor Commemorative Statues. London and Oxford: Savoy Press.
