= Monument to Prince Volodymyr =

1853 monument in Kyiv

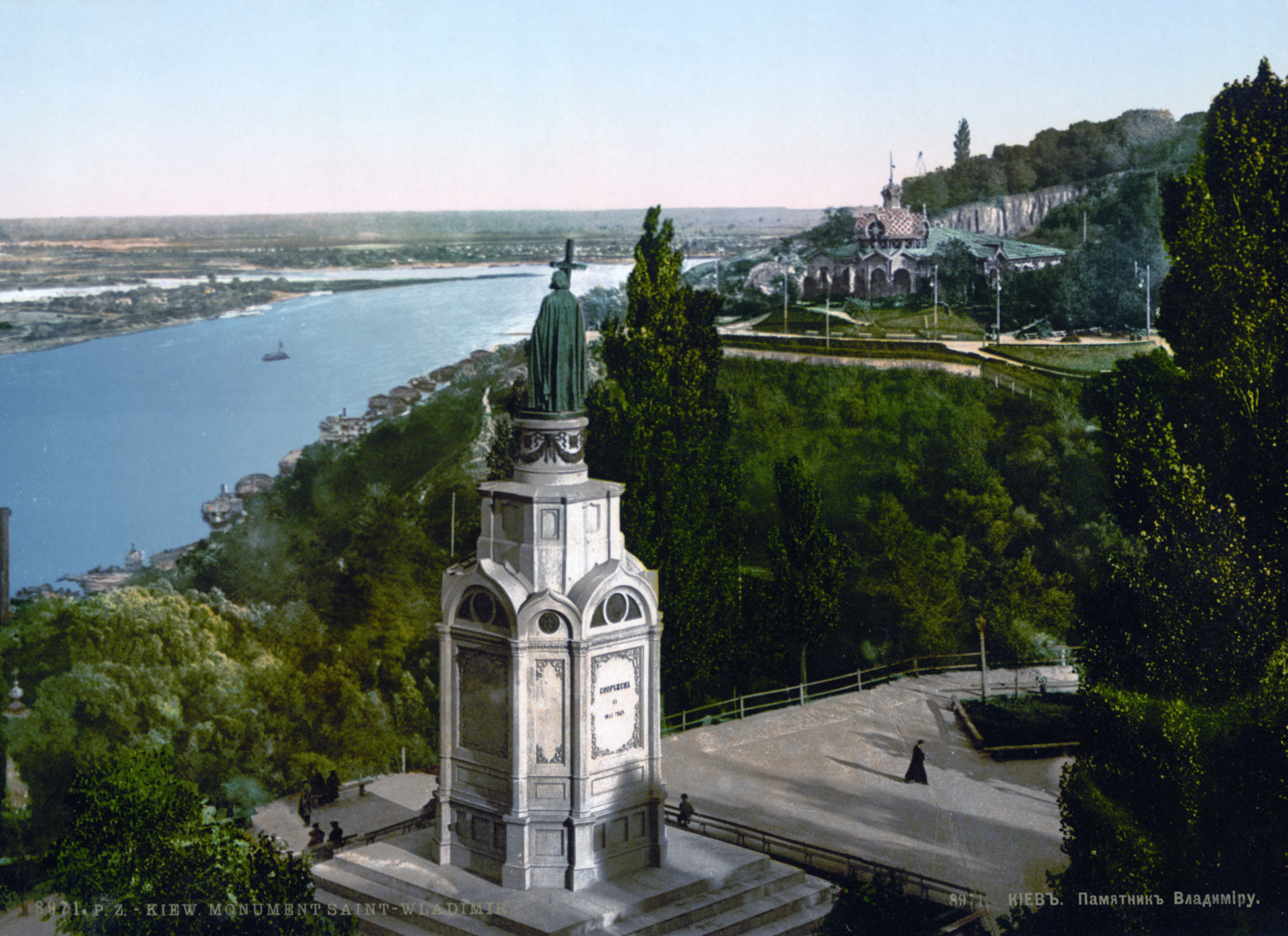
- Monument before World War I

- Location within Ukraine

General information
- Architectural style: pseudo Neo-Byzantine
- Location: Kyiv, Ukraine
- Coordinates: 50.4564°N 30.5263°E
- Opened: 1853

Technical details
- Material: bronze

Design and construction
- Architect: Vasily Demut-Malinovsky

Immovable Monument of National Significance of Ukraine
- Official name: Пам'ятник князю Володимиру (Monument to Prince Volodymyr)
- Type: Monumental Art
- Reference no.: 260009-Н

Monument to Prince Volodymyr (Ukrainian: Пам’ятник Володимиру Великому, romanized: Pamiatnyk Volodymyru Velykomu) is a monument in Kyiv, dedicated to the Grand Prince of Kyiv Volodymyr the Great, built in 1853. It is located on Volodymyrska Hill, the steep right bank of the Dnipro. It is the oldest sculptural monument, a dominating feature of the Dnipro banks, and one of the city's symbols.

== Description ==
The bronze statue of the Baptizer of the Rus' people, depicting him in a coat with a big cross in his right hand and the Great Prince hat in his left, stands 4.4 m (14 ft) tall on a 16 m (52 ft) tall pedestal that has the silhouette of an octagonal chapel in pseudo-Byzantine style on a square stylobate. The brick pedestal and stylobate are revetted with cast iron plates. The total height of the monument is 20.4 m (67 ft).

Started by Vasily Demut-Malinovsky, the monument was finished by Peter Clodt von Jürgensburg in 1853.

== Legacy ==
The monument is also depicted on Ukrainian karbovanets banknotes issued in 1993 to 1995.

== Gallery ==
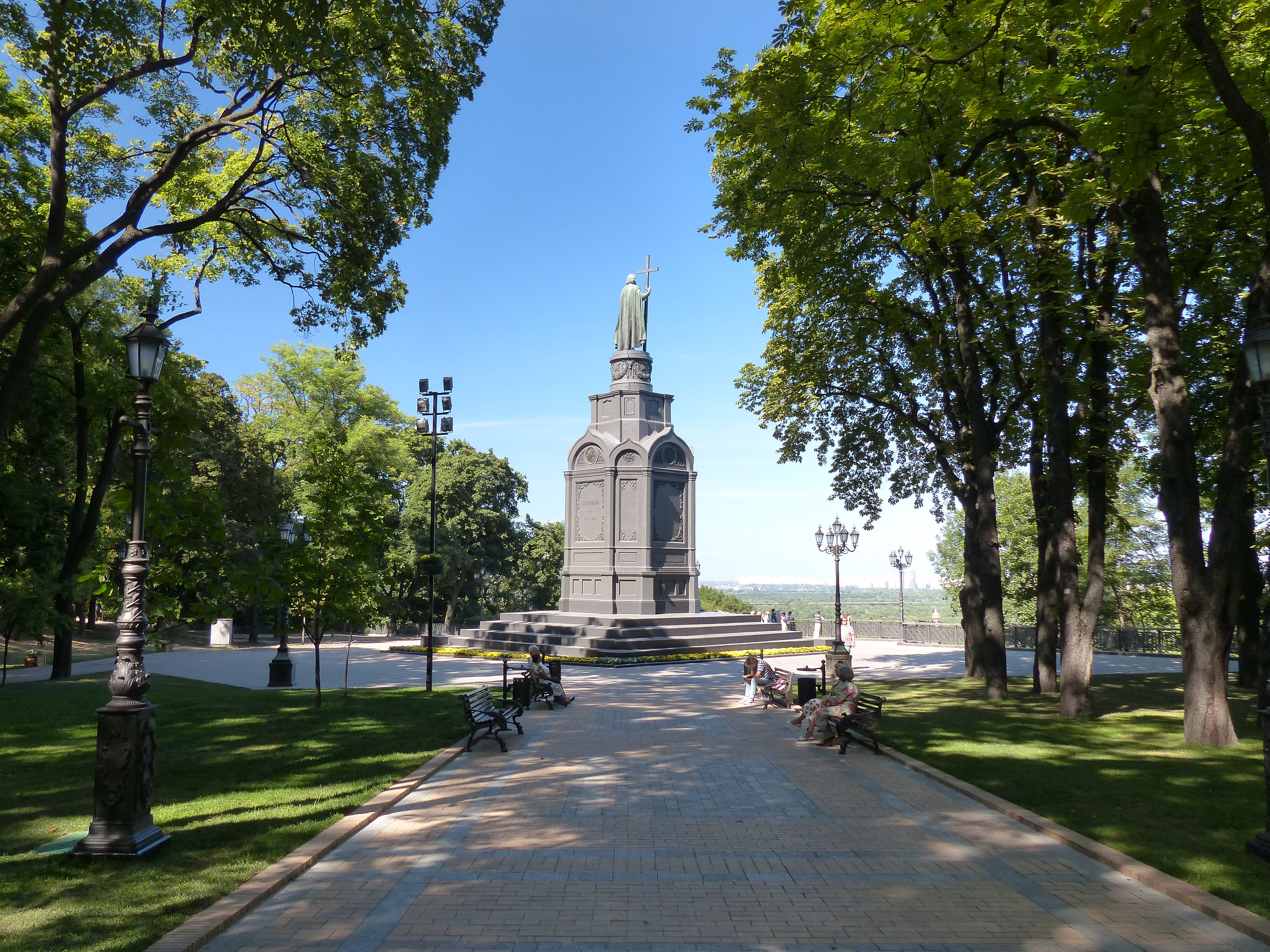
Park zone around the monument, 2013

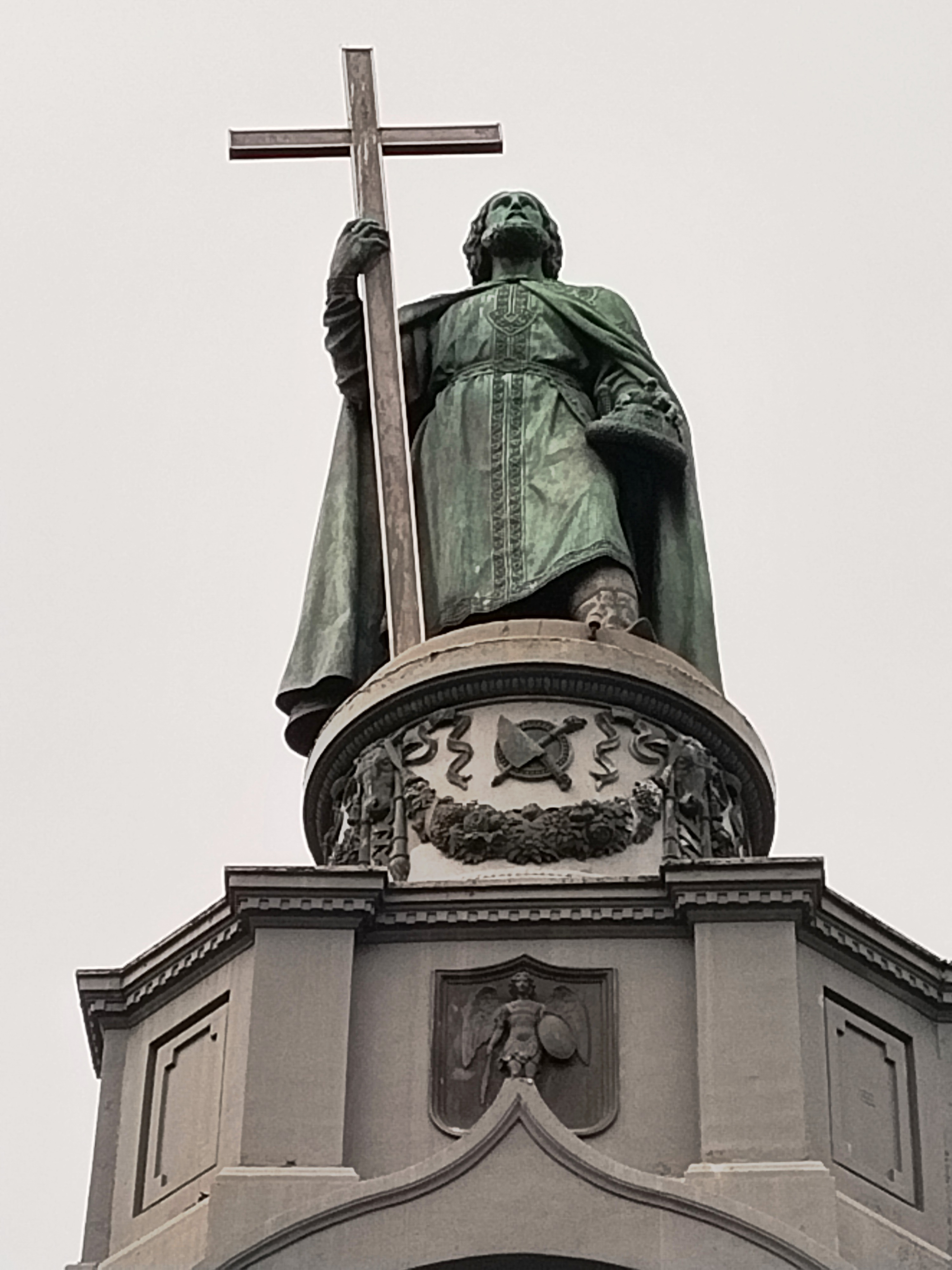
Front view of monument, 2021

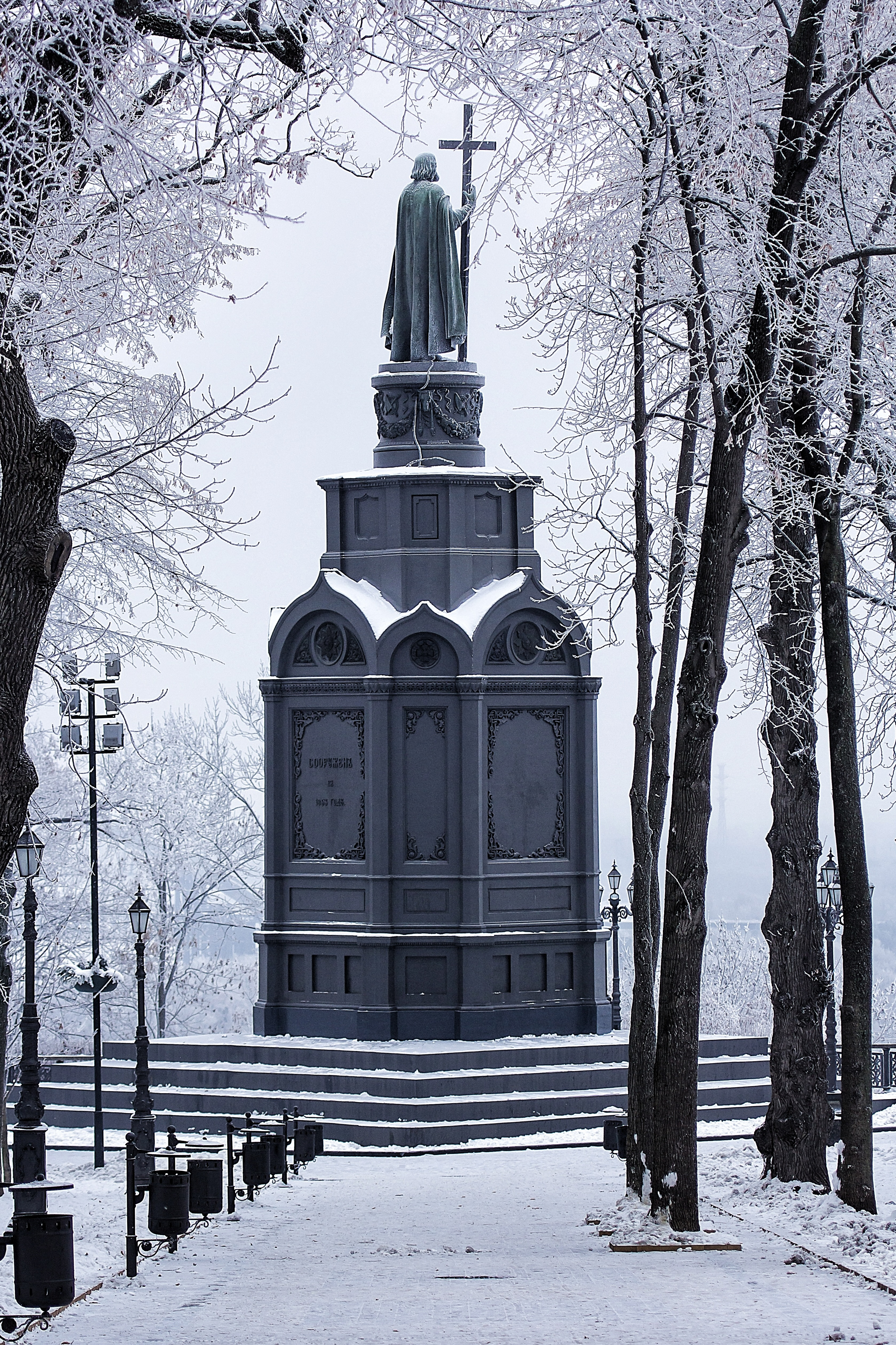
Monument in winter, 2015

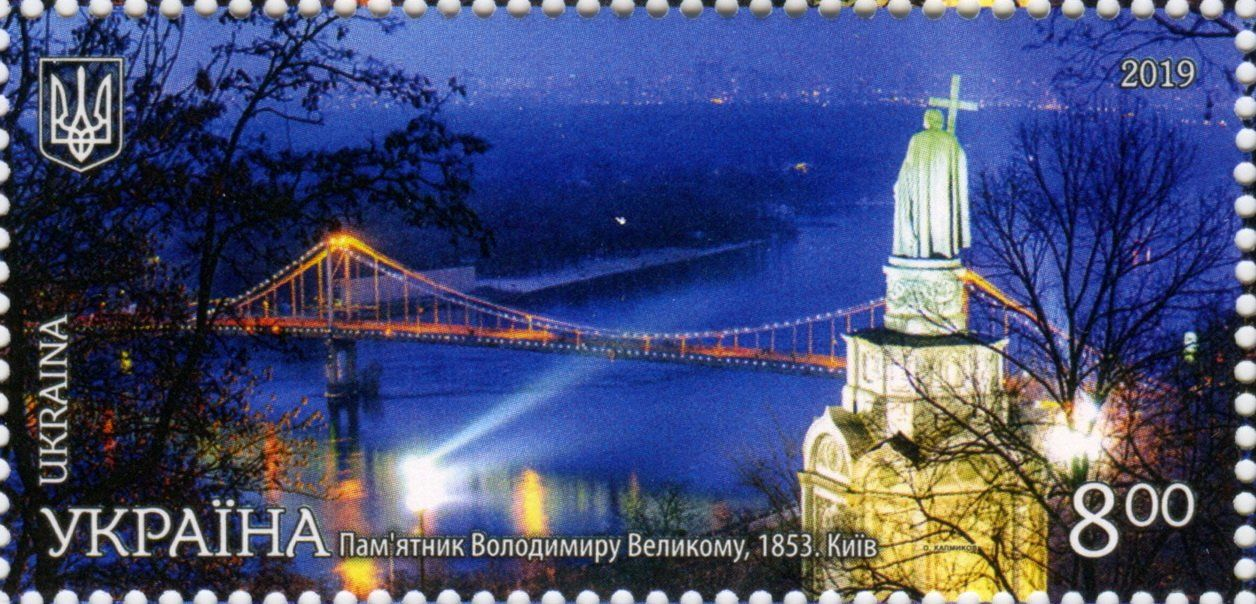
Stamps of Ukraine, 2019

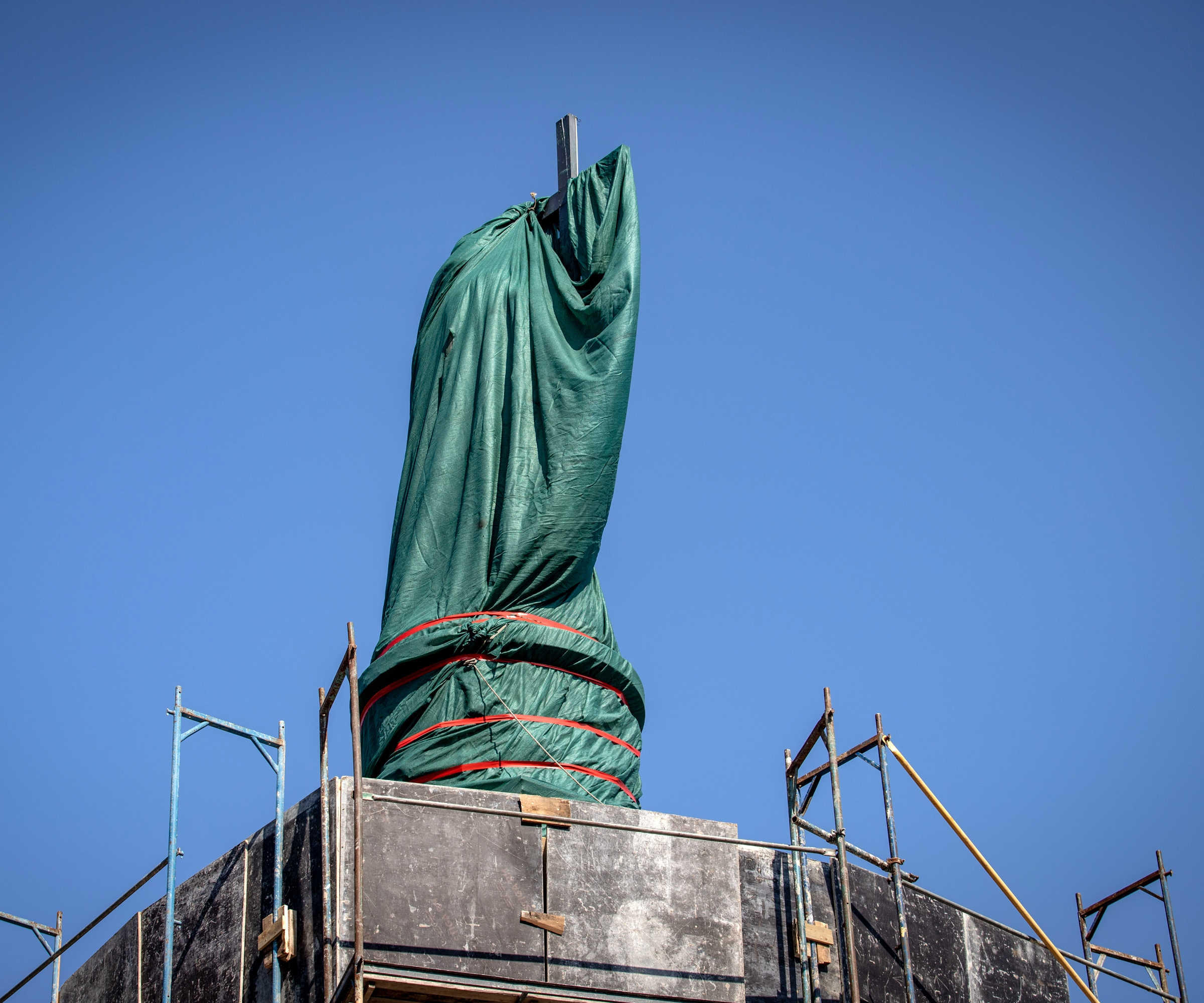
The monument in protective wrap during the Russian invasion of Ukraine, 2022

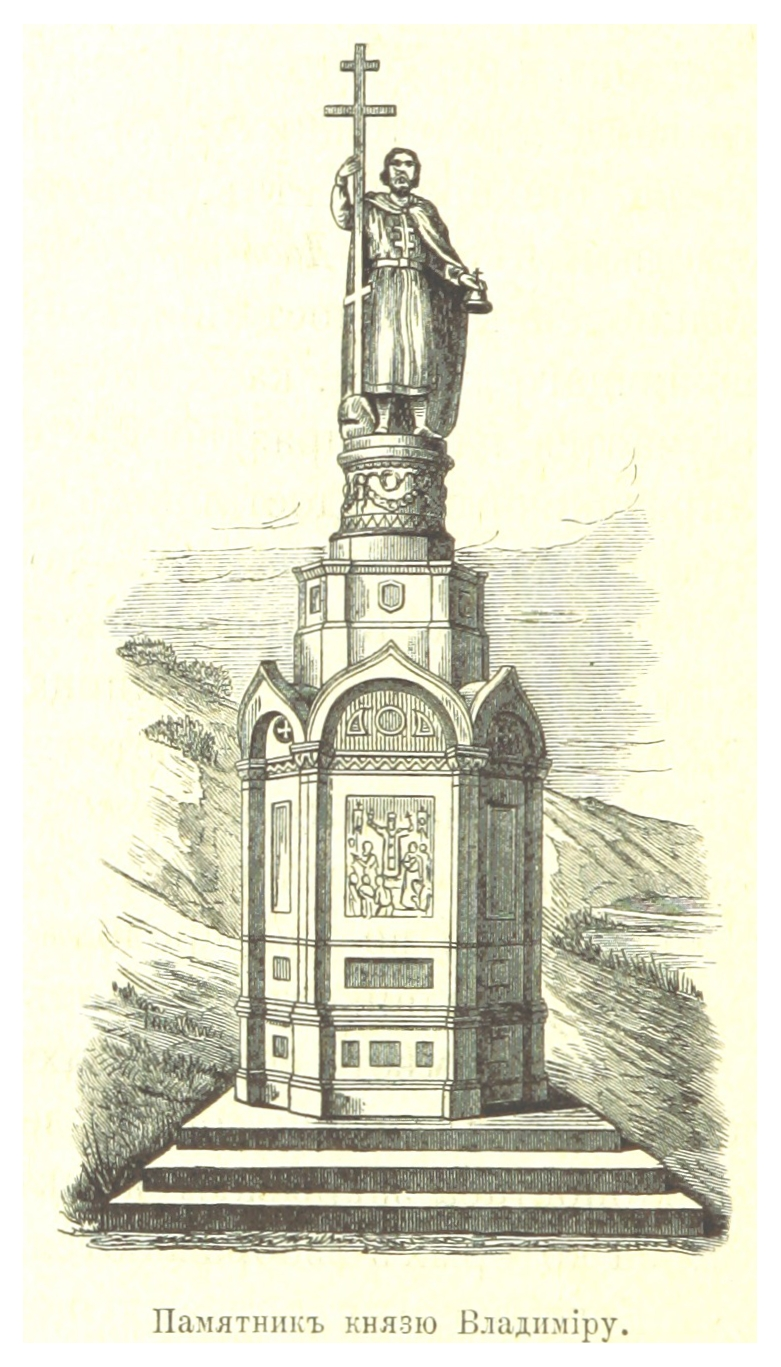
Monument sketch, 1894

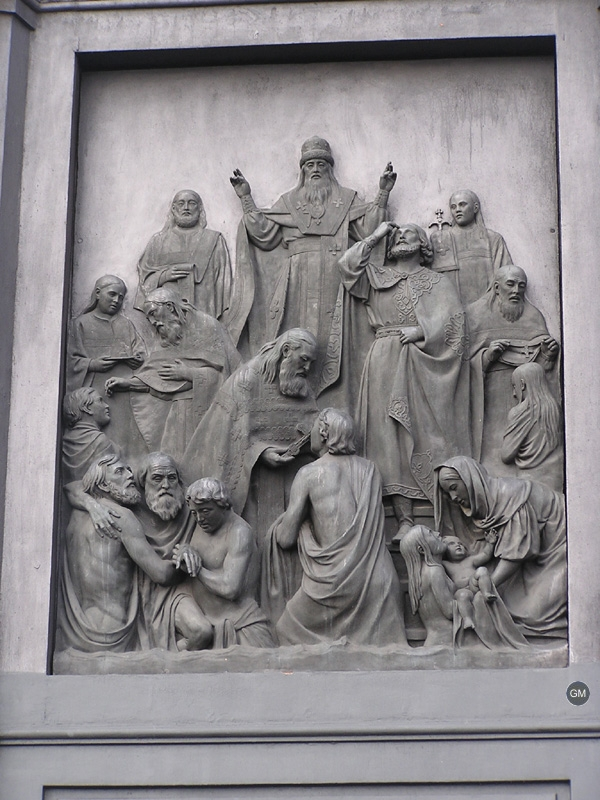
"Christianization of Kyivan Rus'", high relief

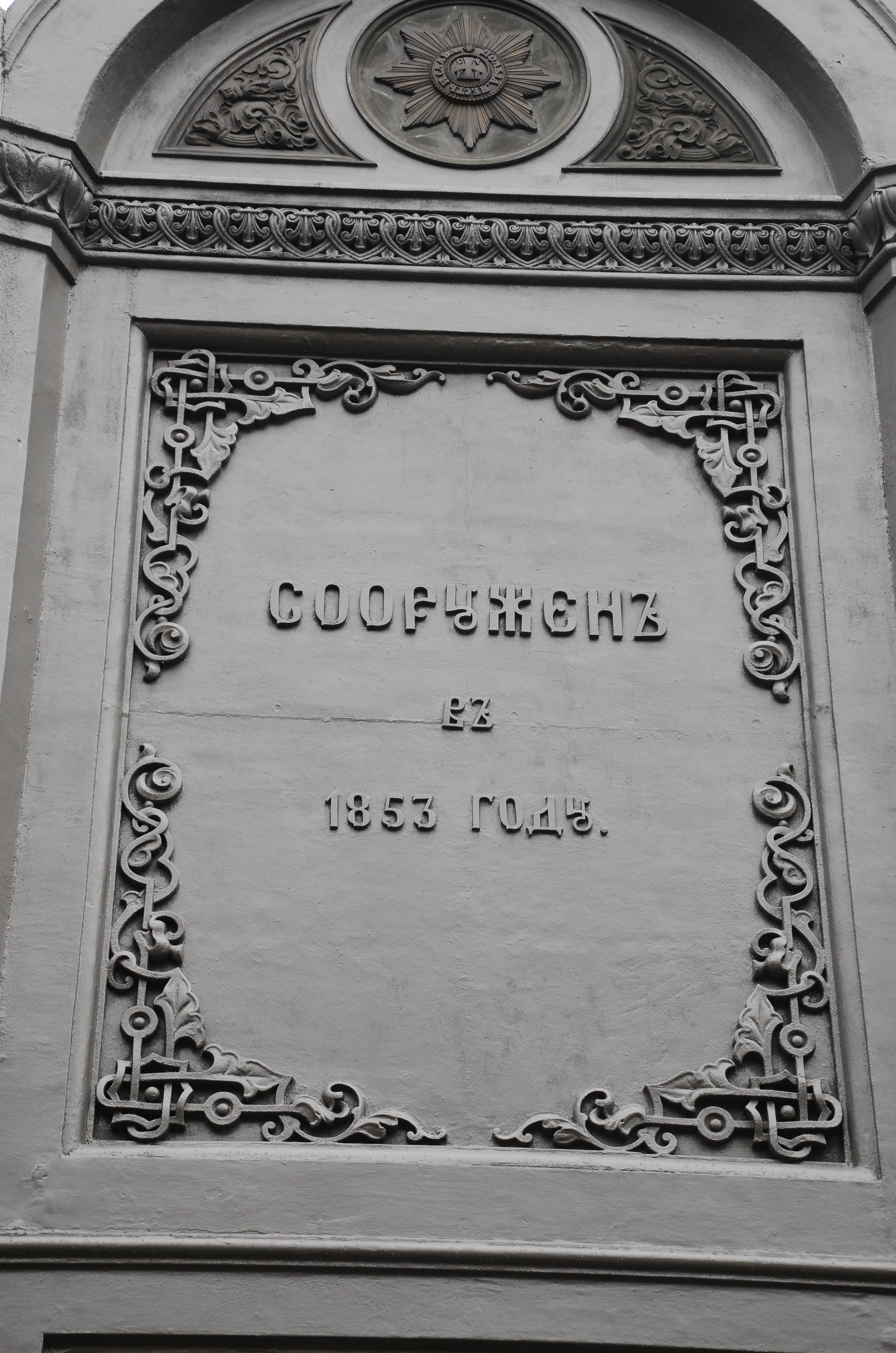
"Built in 1853" (in Russian), high relief

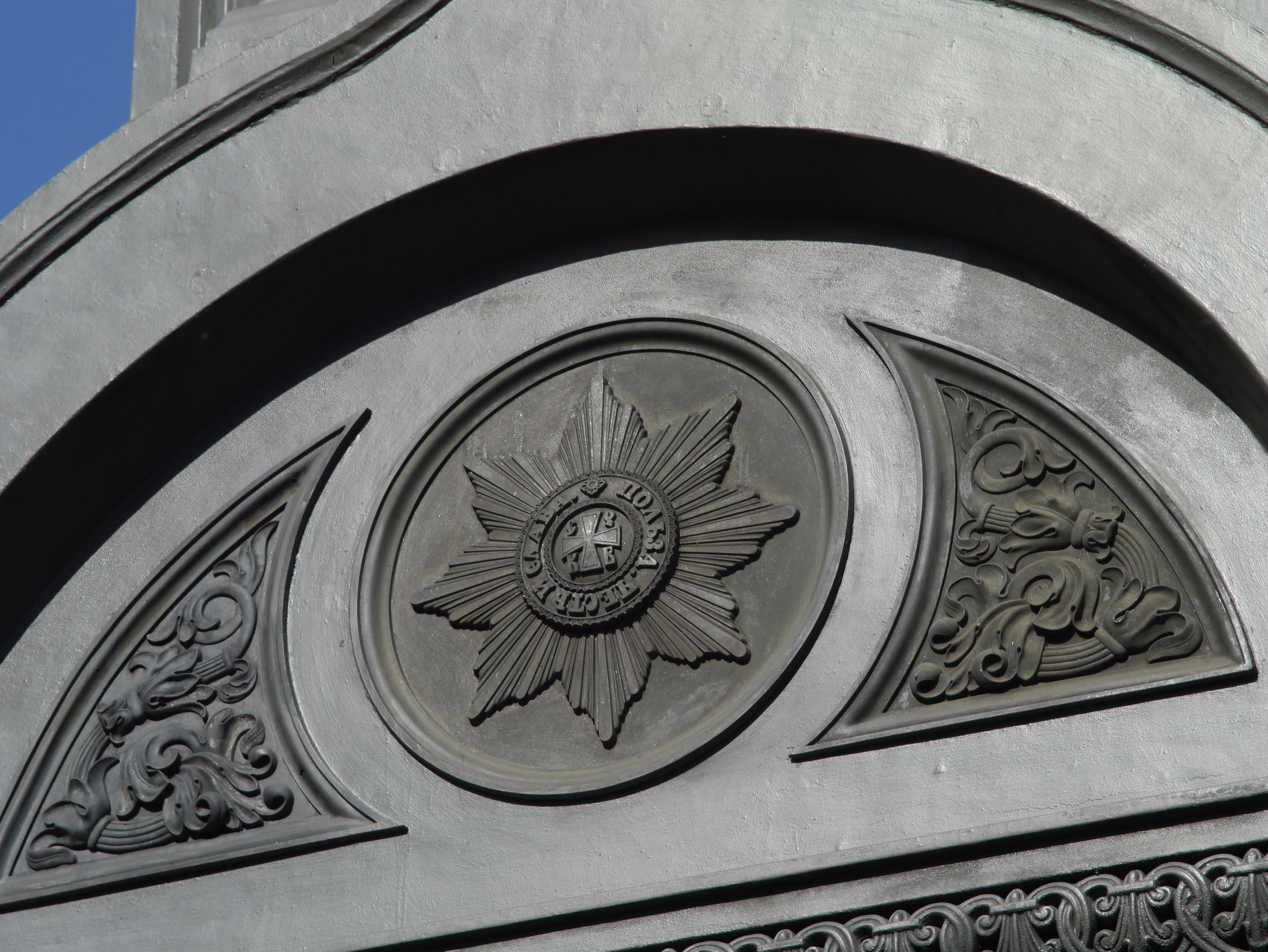
"Order of St. Vladimir", low relief

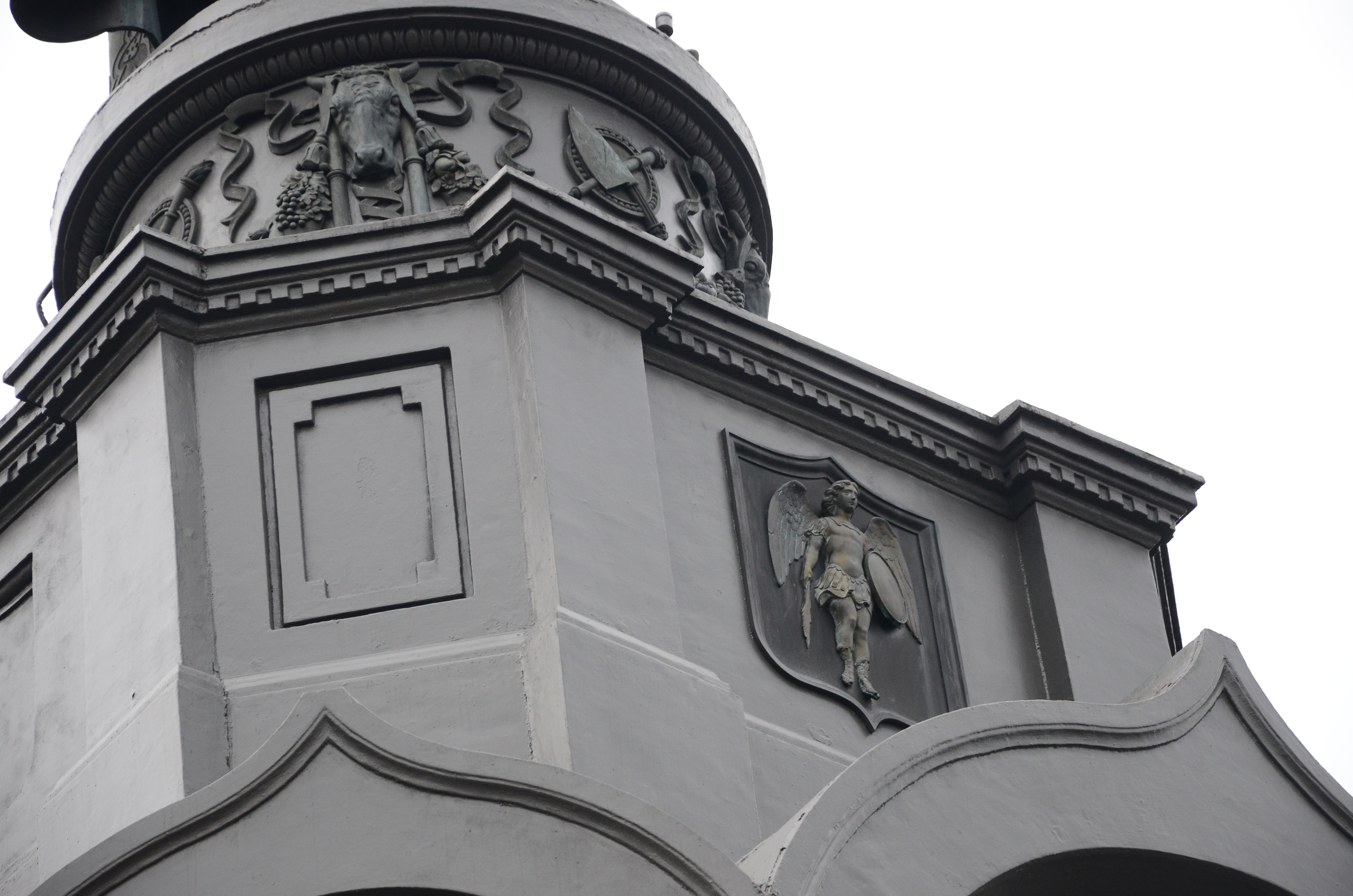
Depiction of Saint Michael, low relief

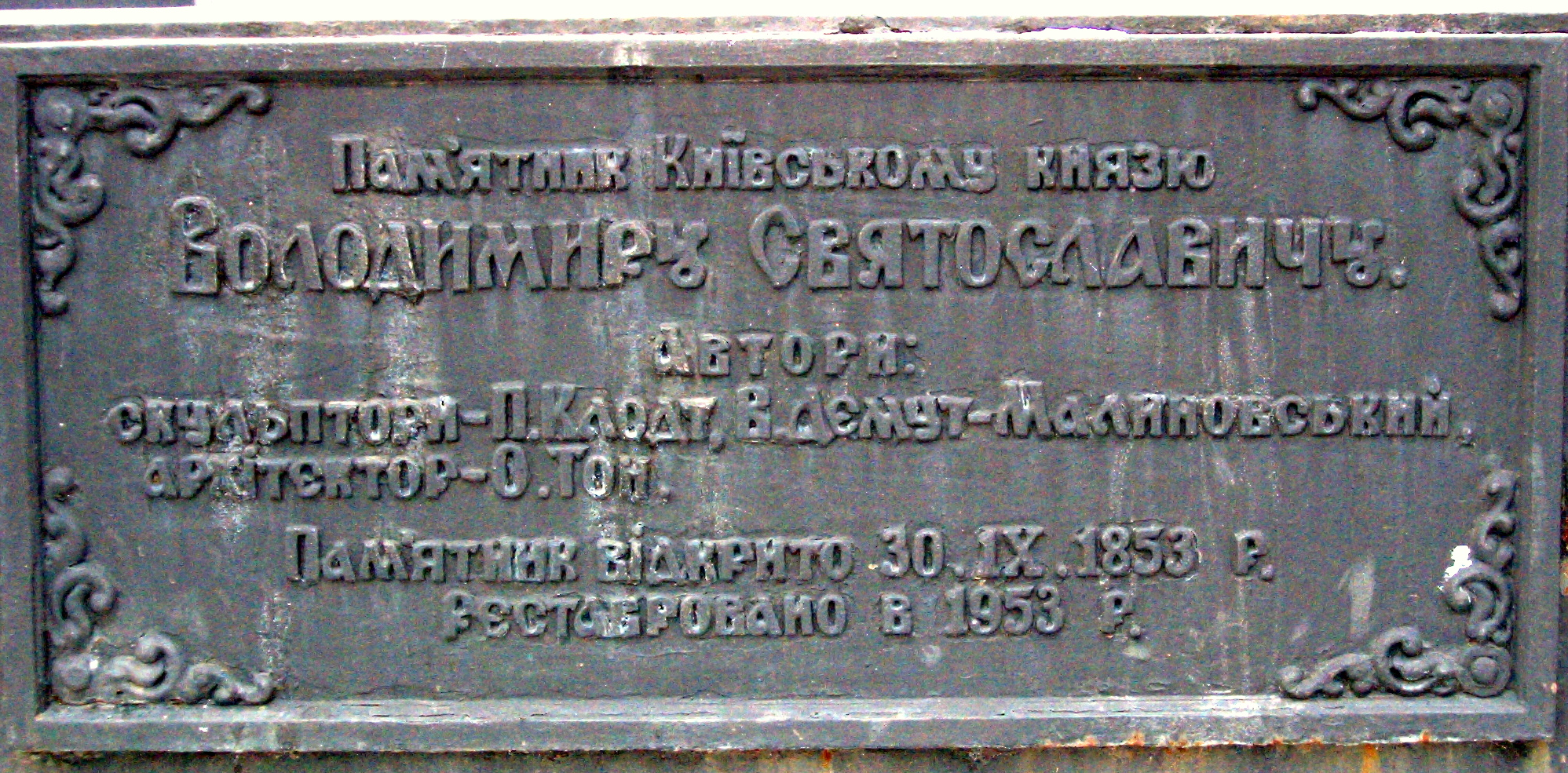
Memorial placard "restored in 1953" (in Ukrainian)

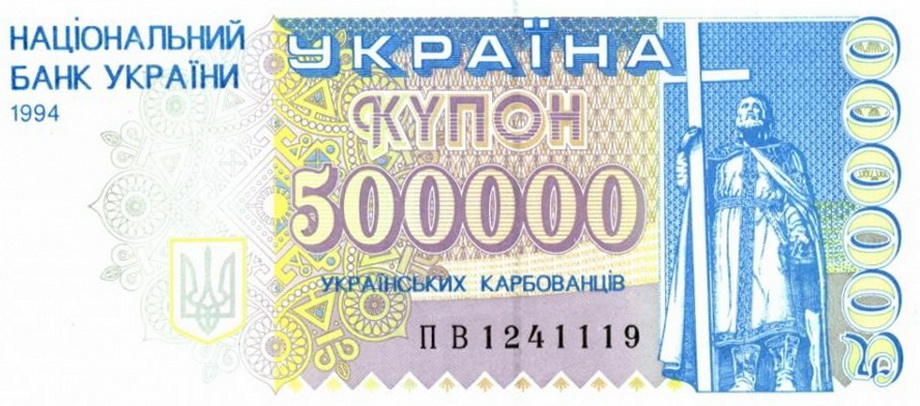
Monument to Prince Volodymyr on the Ukrainian banknotes

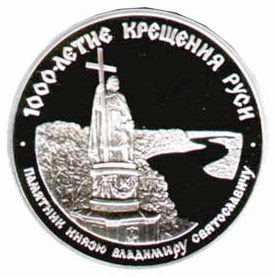
Monument to Prince Volodymyr on the Soviet jubilee coin of 25 Rbls

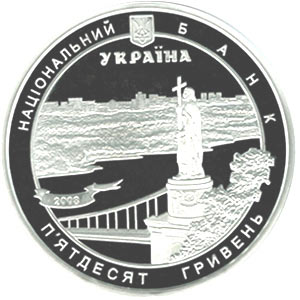
Monument to Prince Volodymyr on the Ukrainian jubilee coin of ₴50

== See also ==
- Christianization of Kievan Rus'
- Monument to Magdeburg Rights, also known as the Saint Volodymyr Lower Monument
- Statue of Saint Volodymyr, London
- Monument to Vladimir the Great (Moscow)
