= Olhynska Street =

Street in Kyiv

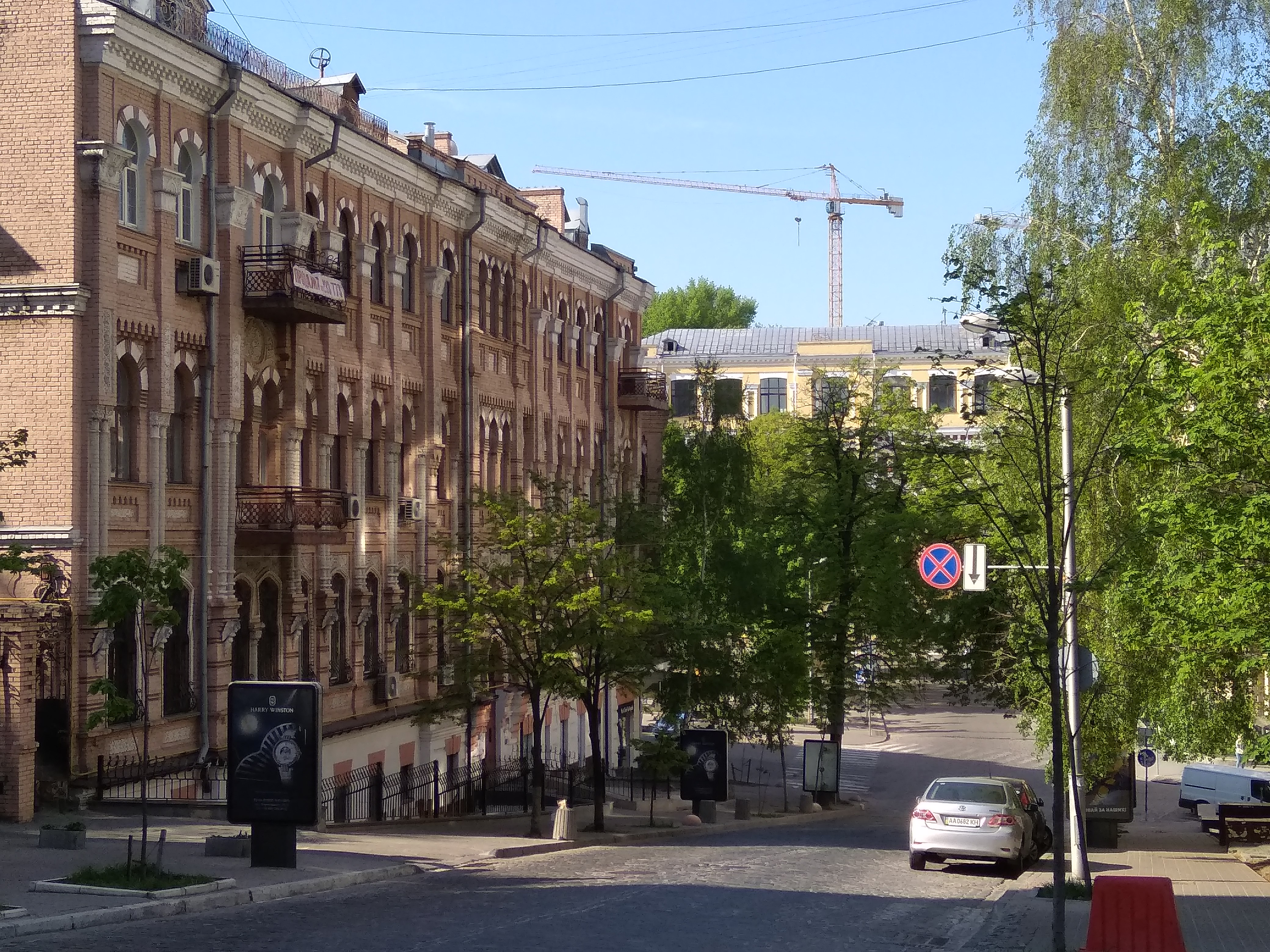
- Olhynska Street, April 2018
- Native name: Ольгинська вулиця (Ukrainian)
- Namesake: Princess Olha of Kyiv
- Length: 192 m (630 ft)
- Location: Lypky, Pecherskyi District, Kyiv, Ukraine
- Postal code: 01001, 01021, 01601
- Coordinates: 50°26′51.9″N 30°31′45.7″E

Olhynska Street (Ukrainian: Ольгинська вулиця, romanized: Olhynska vulytsia) is street in the Pecherskyi District of the city of Kyiv, part of the wider Lypky neighbourhood at the site of the former Friedrich Mering estate. It runs from Instytutska Street and the Alley of Heroes of the Heavenly Hundred to Architect Horodetsky Street and Ivan Franko Square.

== History ==
The street was established at the end of the 19th century as part of the planning and development of the former garden and estate of Friedrich Mering (died 1887), as one of the newly laid-out streets, named in honour of Grand Princess regnant Olha of Kyiv (r. 945–962). Since 1938 it was named Mayakovsky Street, in honour of the Soviet poet Mayakovsky (this name was confirmed in 1944). The street’s historical name was restored in 1984.

The buildings along the street were partially destroyed by explosions in the autumn of 1941. Only the school building and two residential buildings have survived: No. 2, on the corner of Franko Square, and No. 1/17, on the corner of Horodetsky Street.

== Buildings ==
- № 2/1: former apartment building, architectural monument (partly on Ivan Franko Square). The actors Yura Hnat, Dmytro Miliutenko and Mykola Yakovchenko lived at 2/1 Olhynska street.
- № 2/4: Secondary general school № 94.
- № 3: Arkada Bank (liquidated in 2024).
- № 6: Tauvers Gallery international.

== Gallery ==
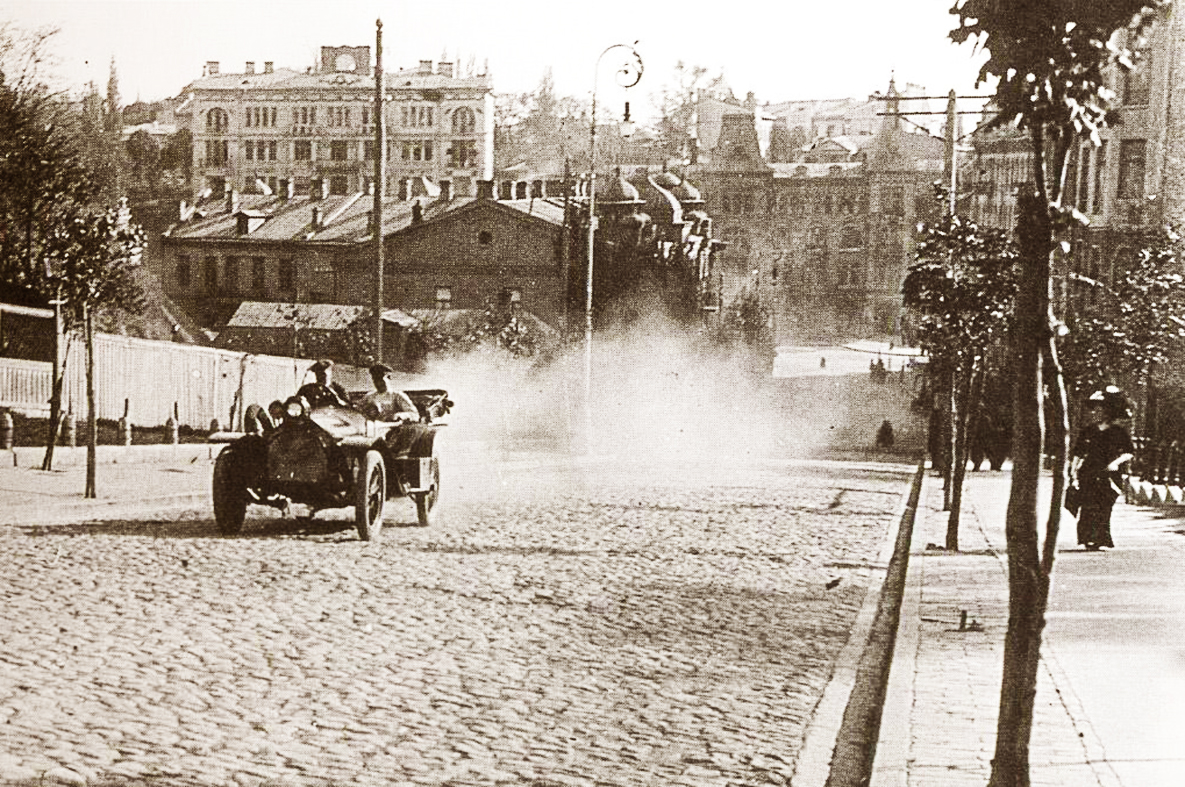
Olhynska Street (1912)

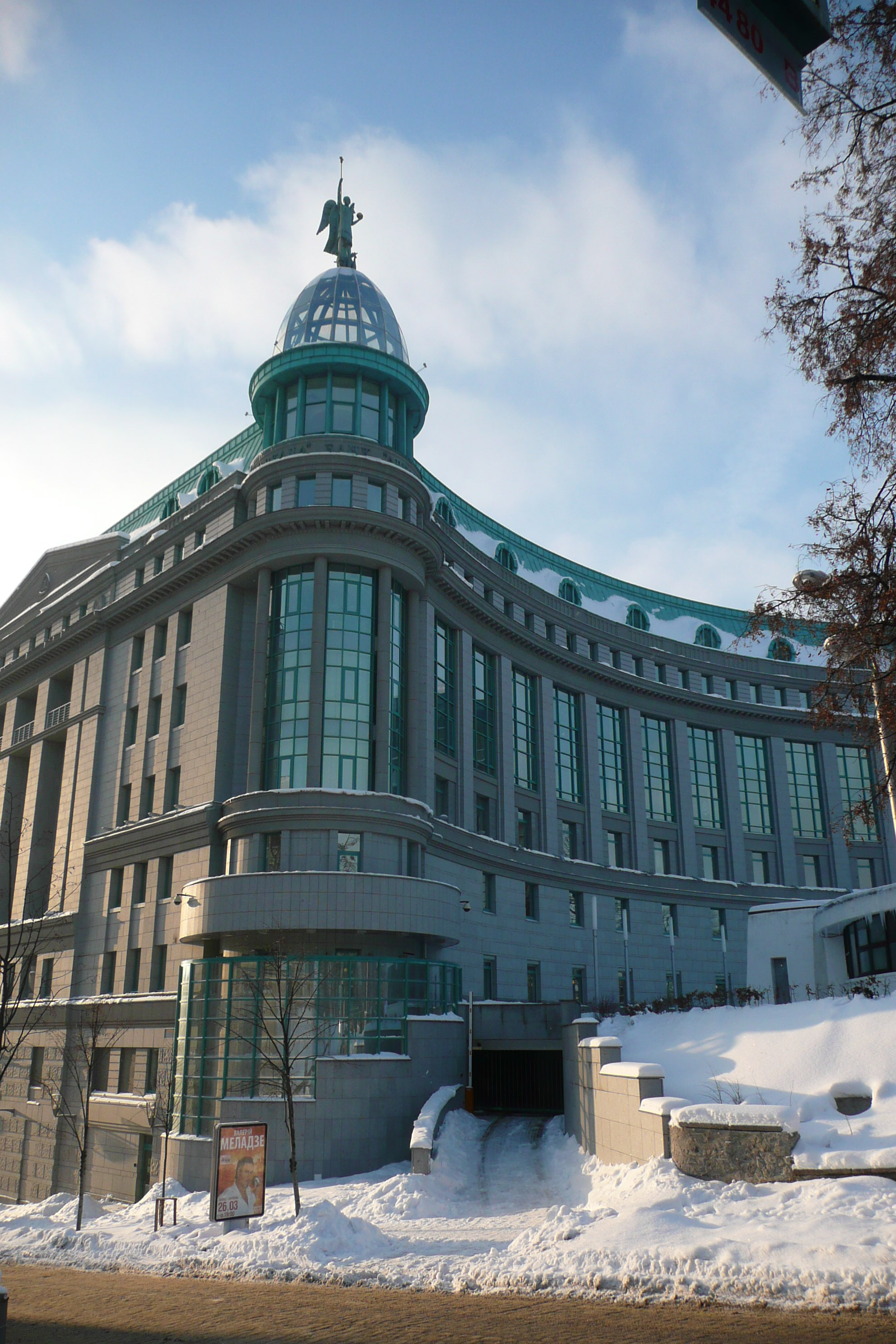
Arkada Bank tower at the high end of Olhynska Street (January 2010)

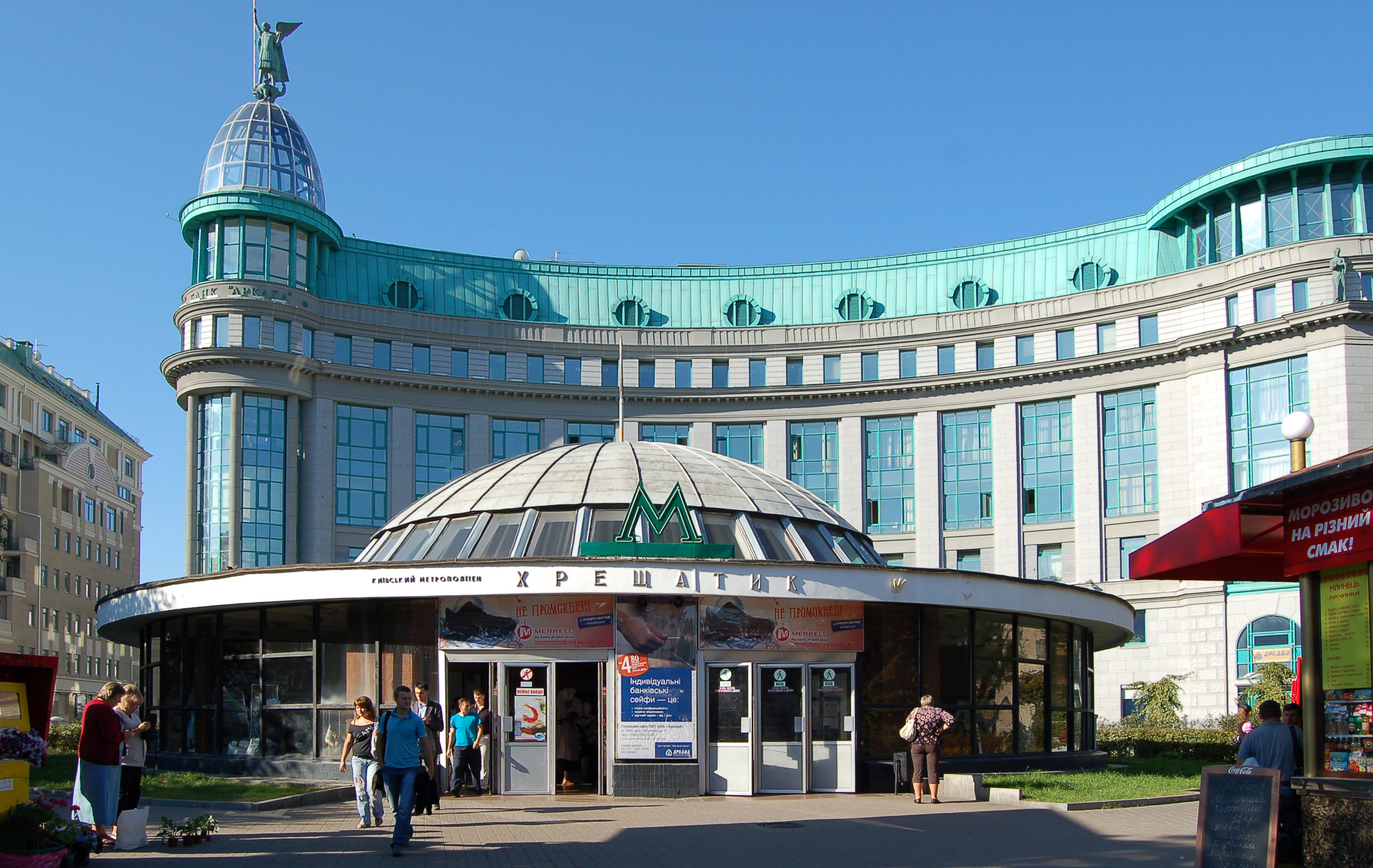
Khreshchatyk metro station entrance on the Instytutska and Olhynska streets corner (2011)

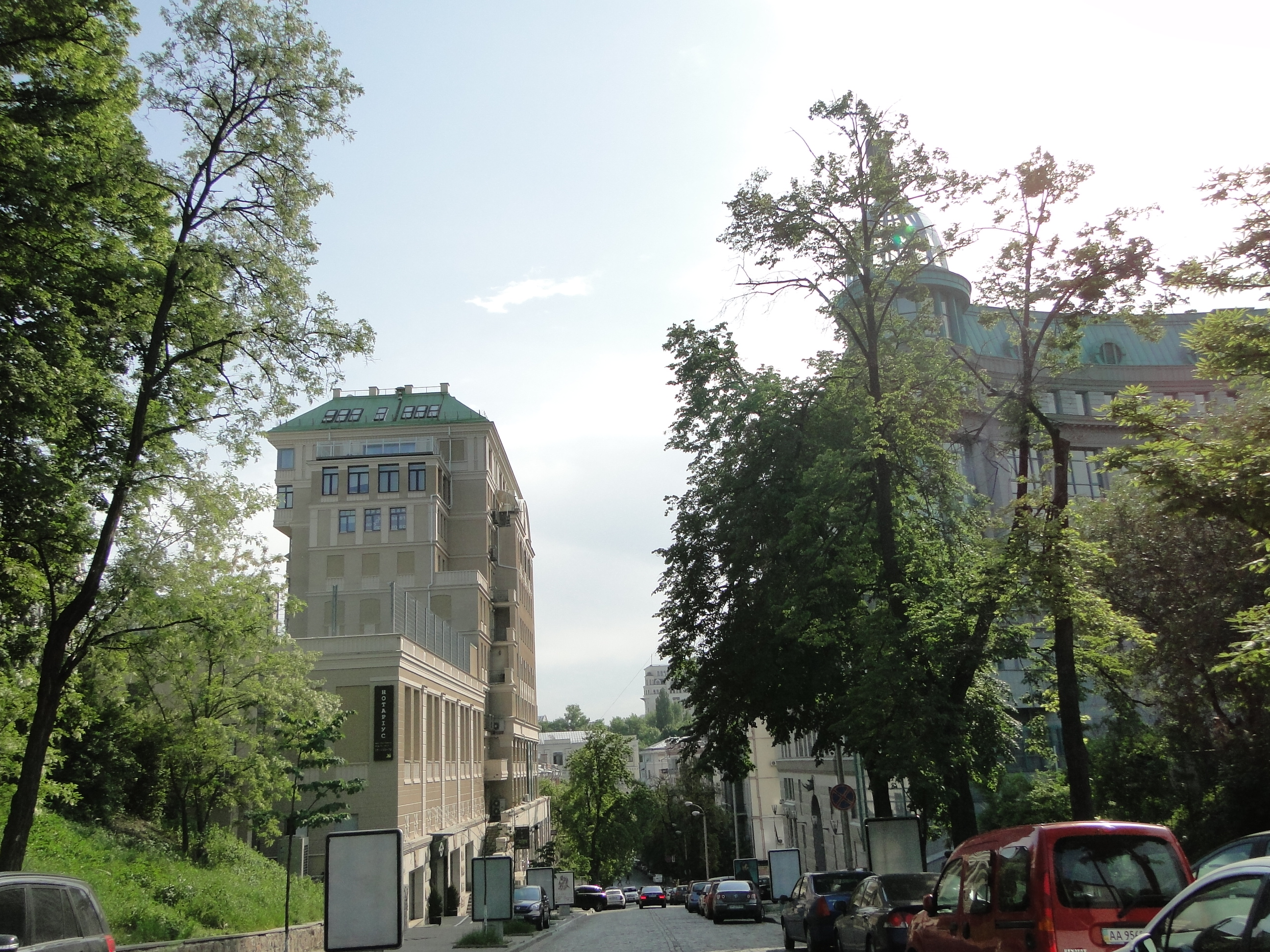
View of Olhynska Street from Instytutska Street (May 2012)

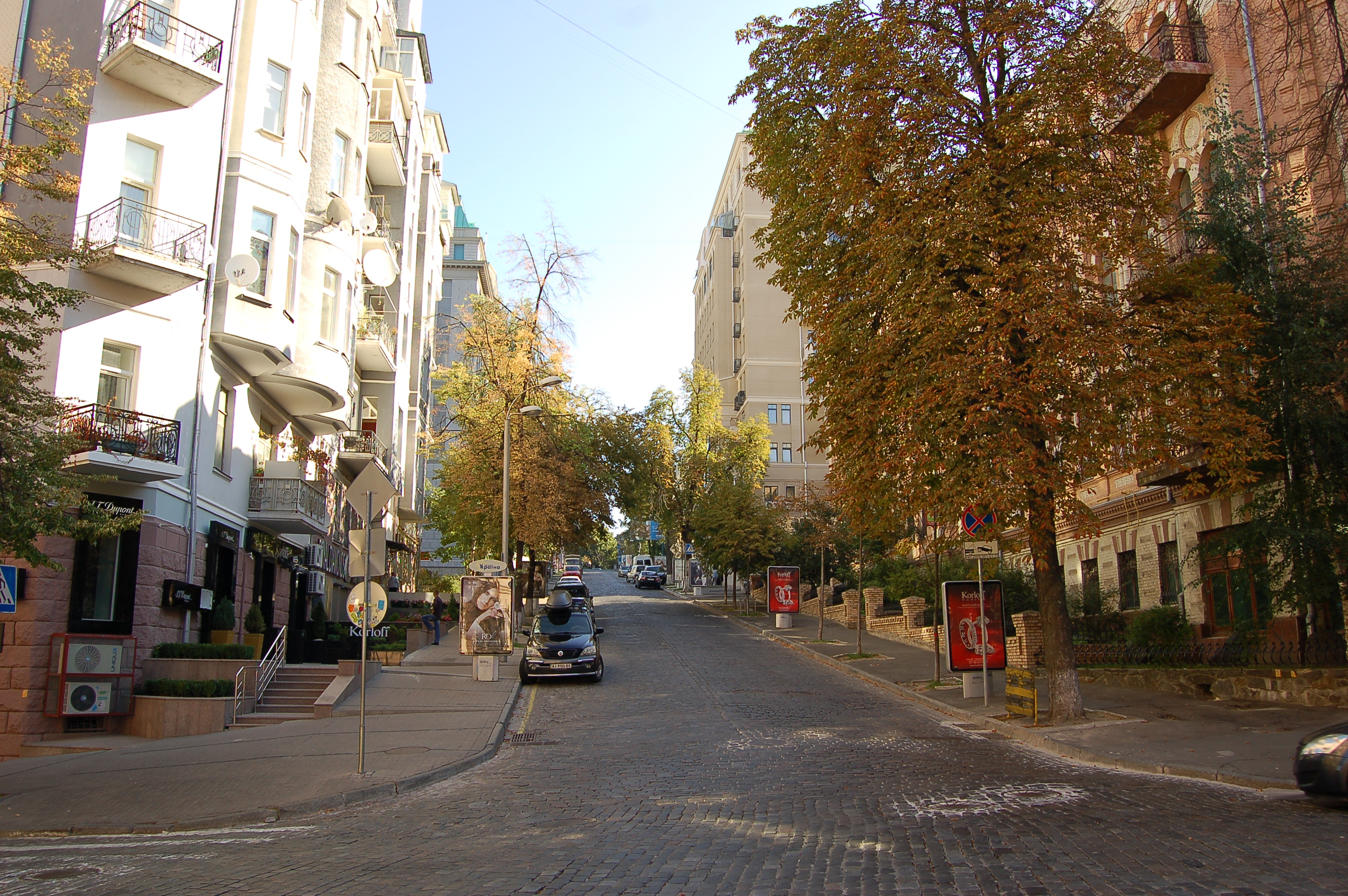
View of Olhynska Street from Ivan Franko Square (September 2011)

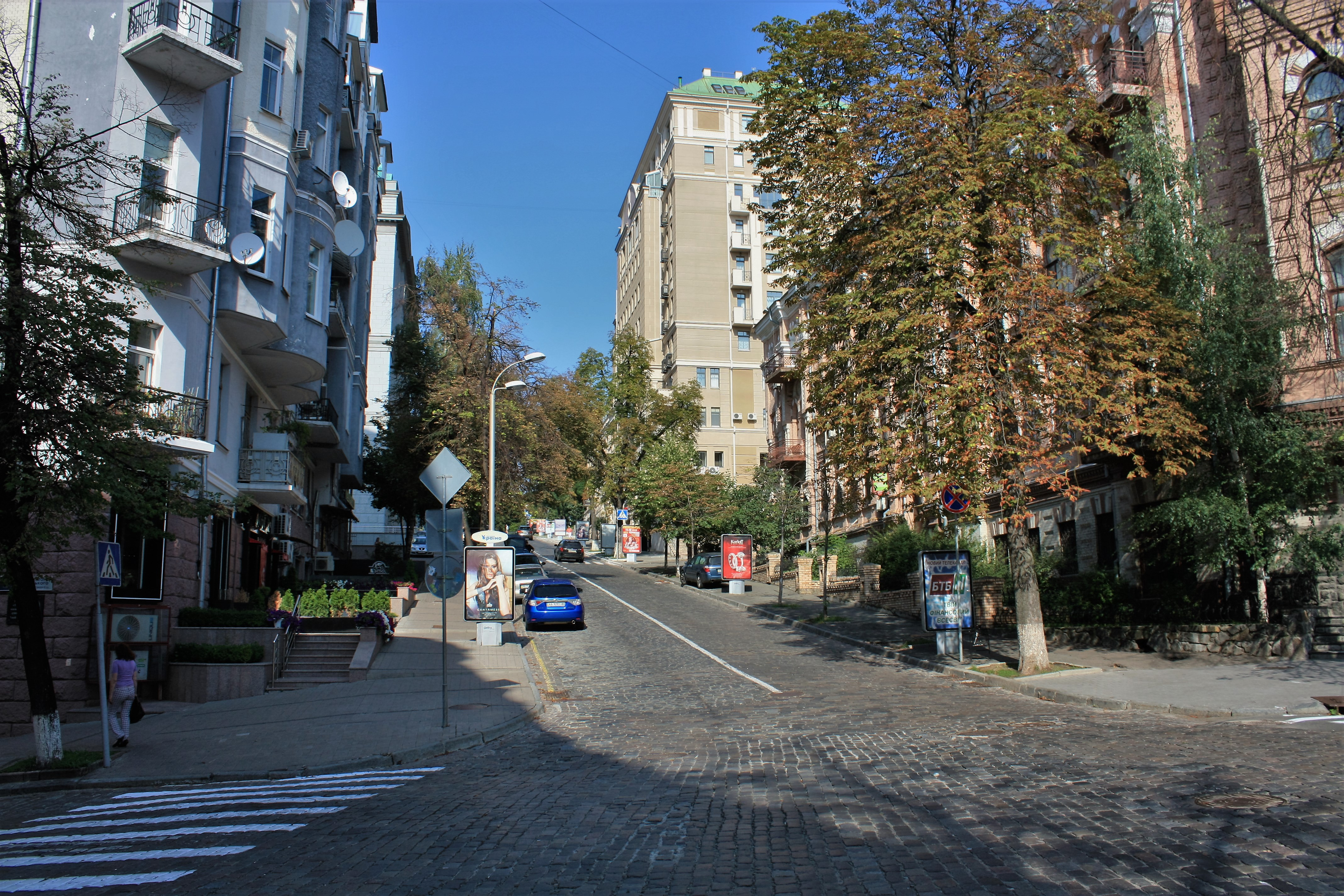
Olhynska Street (August 2012)

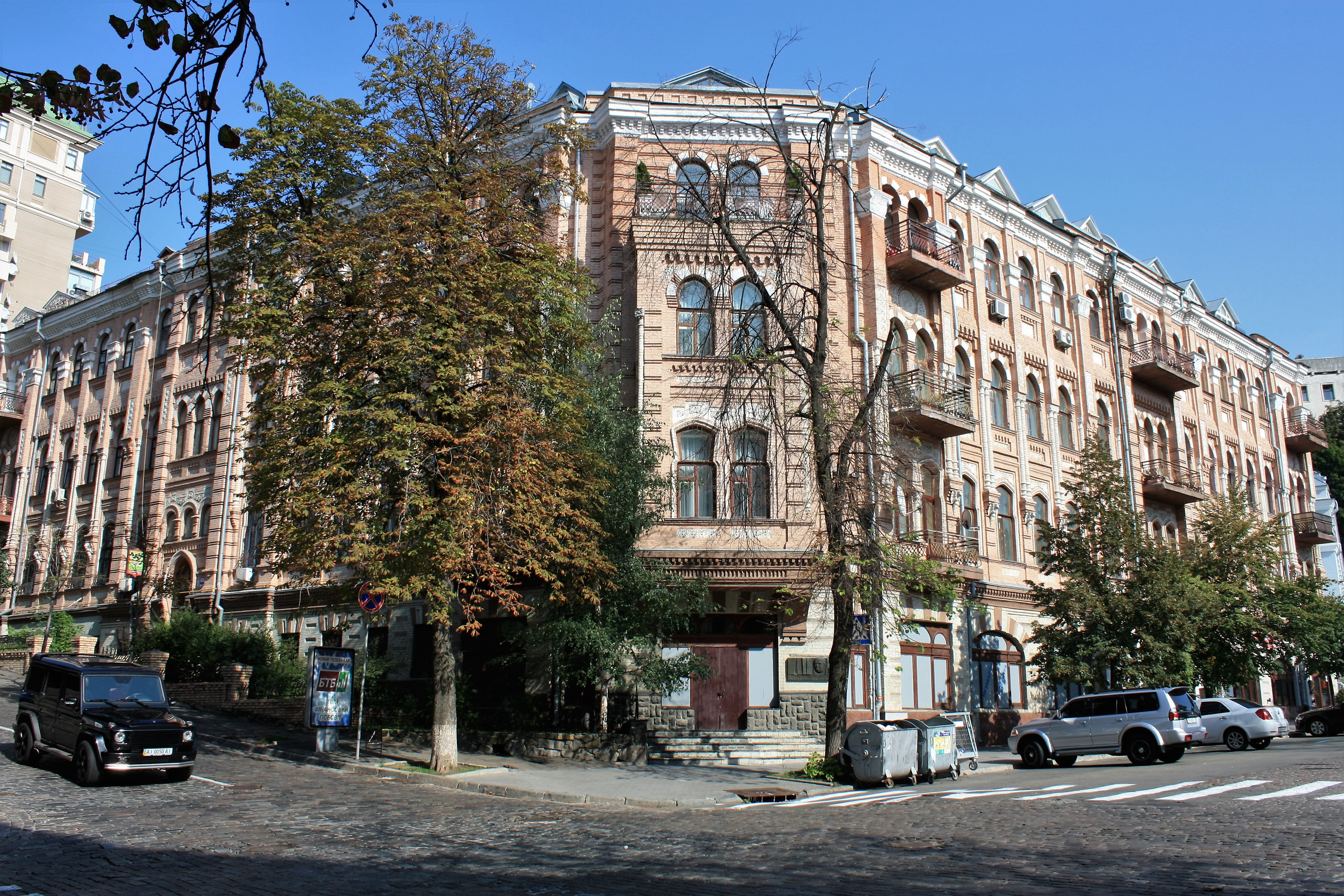
No. 2/1, corner of Olhynska Street and Ivan Franko Square (August 2012)

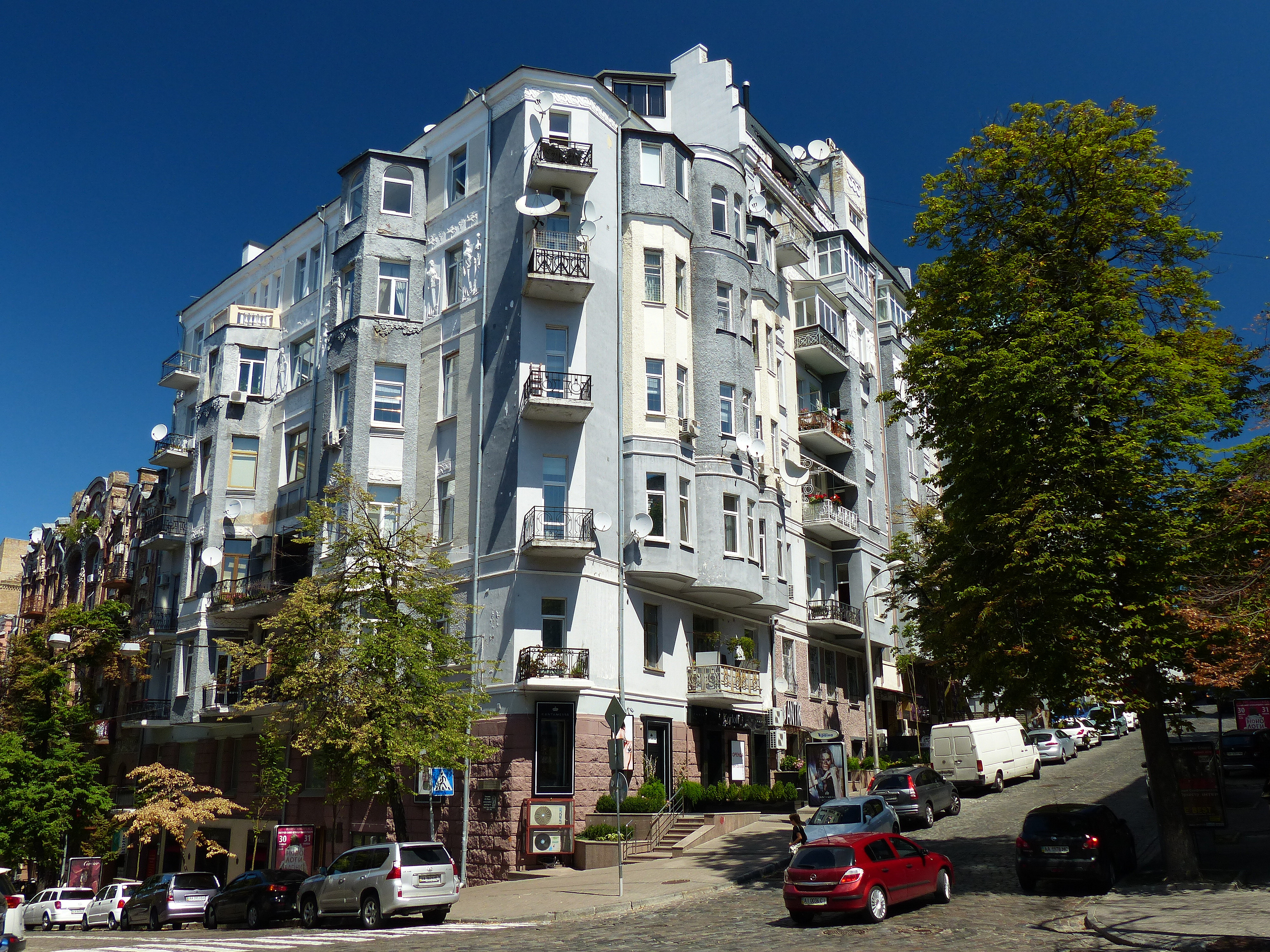
Corner of Olhynska Street and Architect Horodetsky Street (July 2013)

== Sources ==
- Web encyclopedia of Kyiv.
- "Маяковського вул." In: Streets of Kyiv: a handbook. Edited by O. I. Marchuk et al. Kyiv: Державне видавництво технічної літератури [State Publishing House of Technical Literature], 1958. p. 185.
- "Маяковського вул." In: Streets of Kyiv: a handbook. Compiled by A. M. Syhalov and others. Kyiv: Reklama [Advertising], 1975. p. 105.
- "Маяковського вул." In: Streets of Kyiv: a handbook. Second, revised edition. Compiled by A. M. Syhalov and others. Kyiv: Reklama [Advertising], 1979. p. 158.
- "Ольгинська вулиця". In: Kudrytskyi, Anatolii Viktorovych; Ponomarenko, Lidiya Antonivna; Riznyk, Oleksandr (1995). Вулиці Києва. Довідник [Streets of Kyiv: a handbook] (in Ukrainian). Kyiv: Ukrainska Entsyklopediia Imeni M.P. Bazhana. p. 156. ISBN 5-88500-070-0.
- "Ольгинська вулиця." In: Streets of Kyiv: Official Handbook. Appendix to the decision of the Kyiv City Council dated 22 January 2015 No. 34/899 “On approval of the official handbook “Streets of Kyiv City””. p. 181.
- Маяковскому В. В. мемориальная доска [Commemorative plaque to V. V. Mayakovsky], in: Kyiv: An Encyclopedic Handbook (1982). ed. A. V. Kudrytsky. Kyiv. pp. 342–343. In Russian.
