= Maksym Tymoshenko =

Ukrainian culturologist and activist

- Максим Тимошенко
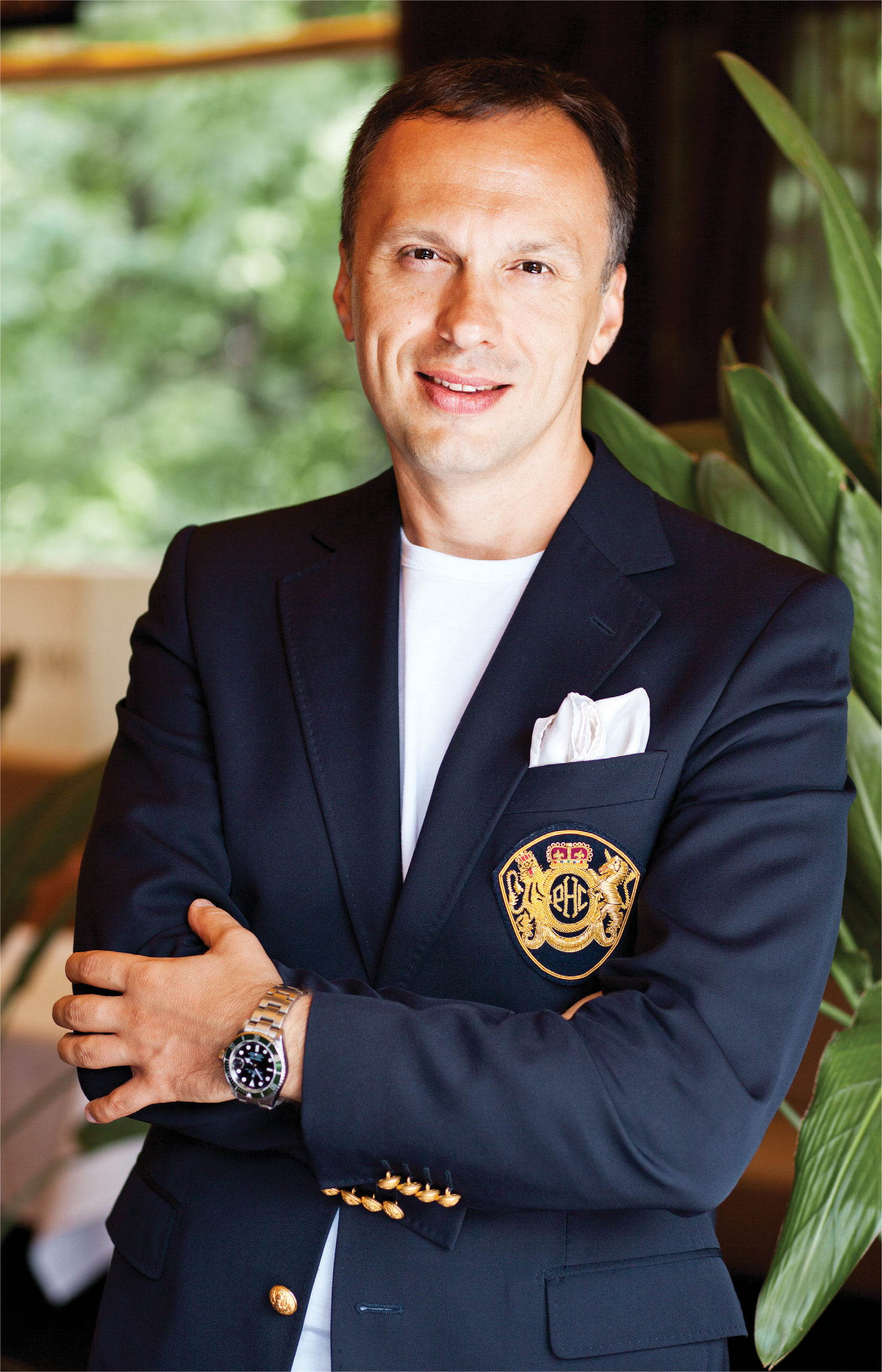
- Born: 20 April 1972 (age 54); Kyiv, Ukrainian SSR, Soviet Union
- Education: Lysenko Kyiv Specialized Music Boarding School
- Alma mater: Kyiv National Economic University; National Academy of Culture and Arts Management
- Occupations: culturologist; social activist
- Known for: President: Green Cross Ukraine; President: Dni Ukrainy
- Children: Sophie
- Parent(s): Oleh Tymoshenko; Vira Tymoshenko
- Awards: Order of Merit (Ukraine); Honored Art Worker of Ukraine; Person of the year (Ukraine)
- Website: greencross.org.ua

Maksym Tymoshenko (Ukrainian: Максим Тимошенко, pronounced [mɐkˈsɪm tɪmoˈʃɛnko]; born 20 April 1972) is a Ukrainian culturologist and a social activist. He is a doctor of philosophy (2013), a professor of the National Academy of Culture and Arts Management (2014), an Honored Art Worker of Ukraine (2015), member of the Green Cross International Board (since October 2017). President of the Ukrainian National Academy of Music as of November 2018.

His awards: the Order of Christ the Saviour (2001), the special prize "For a Considerable Contribution to Promoting a Positive Image of Ukraine in the World" of the nationwide program "Person of the Year" (2004), the title of Ambassador for Peace (2005), the Order of Merit, 3rd class (2006). He is the chairman of the board of the international charitable foundation Dukhovna Spadshcyna (Ukrainian: Духовна спадщина, Spiritual Heritage) (1997–2003, since 2003 its honorary chairman). The president of the international foundation Dni Ukrainy (Ukrainian: Дні України, Days of Ukraine) (since 2006). The president of the national environmental organization Green Cross Ukraine (since 2012)., became an Honorary President of Petro Tchaikovsky International Hengshui Academy of Music and Arts (China). On August 28, 2026, awarded the Order of the Star of Italy pursuant to the decree of the President of the Italian Republic dated May 29, 2026.

== Biography ==
Maksym Tymoshenko was born in Kyiv, Ukraine, on 20 April 1972 in the family of an educator, music professor and the president of the Kyiv Conservatory Oleh Tymoshenko. Maksym Tymoshenko graduated from the Kyiv Lysenko State Music Lyceum (1990). He graduated from the Kyiv National Economic University (1996, faculty of economy), with MBA. He got the second higher education at the National Academy of Culture and Arts Management(2012).

He worked at the Ukrainian Culture Foundation's Office in Kyiv (1991–1992, as the head of department; 1992–1993, as the director), at Nezalezhnist JSCB (1993–1997, as the chairman of the board), in the administration of the (Ukraine's national parliament) Verkhovna Rada (2003–2014), National Academy of Culture and Arts Management (since 2012, since 2013 as an associate professor, since 2014 as a professor). He lives in Kyiv.

== Activity ==
=== Academic activities ===
Maksym Tymoshenko is the author of over 20 publications in academic books and periodicals. He participated in a number of academic conferences. His PhD thesis is titled "International humanitarian strategies in contemporary Ukraine as a systemic cultural and artistic phenomenon" (2012). His PhD was awarded in 2013.

=== Social activity ===
The Dni Ukrainy foundation under M. Tymoshenko's supervision promotes cultural achievements of the country. "Days of Ukraine in Europe" were held along the French Riviera (Cannes, Nice, Monte Carlo, 2004), in Paris (2004, 2005), Vatican City (2005), the Principality of Monaco (Monte Carlo, 2006, 2009).

Green Cross Ukraine (being under M. Tymoshenko's supervision since 2012) is a national committee of Green Cross International. The organization supports children affected by the accident at the Chernobyl nuclear power plant. Throughout 12 years of its work, over 40 thousand children were cured and restored to health.

Since May 2019 – Co-chairman of the Organizing Committee of the All-Ukrainian Open Music Olympiad "Voice of The Country".

Since July 2019 – Co-chairman of the Organizing Committee of the All-Ukrainian Open Piano Competition named after S.S. Prokofiev.

May, 2020 – became an Honorary President of Petro Tchaikovsky International Hengshui Academy of Music and Arts.

== Literature ==
=== The author's publications ===
1. Тимошенко, М. О. Гуманітарні аспекти державної культурної політики сучасної України // Трансформація освіти і культура: традиції та сучасність : матеріали міжнар. наук.-творчої конференції, Одеса–Київ–Варшава, 2–3 травня 2012 р. К., 2012. С. 95. (in Ukrainian)
2. Тимошенко, М. О. Міжнародні гуманітарні стратегії в сучасній Україні як системний культуротворчий феномен : автореф. дис. ... канд. культурології : 26.00.01. К., 2012. 20 с. (in Ukrainian)
3. Тимошенко, М. О. Персоніфікація композиторської творчості як спосіб усвідомлення та презентації ціннісного культурного досвіду // Культура і сучасність. К., 2013. No. 1. С. 99–104. (in Ukrainian)
4. Тимошенко, М. О. До питання про національно-стильові чинники в культурно-мистецькому просторі // Культура і сучасність. К., 2014. No. 1. C. 77–82. (in Ukrainian)

=== Biographical materials ===
1. Тимошенко М. О. // Хто є хто в Україні. К. : КІС, 2006. С. 963. (in Ukrainian)
2. Ємельянова, Л. П. Родина Тимошенків. К., 2012. С. 66–117, 172–189. (in Ukrainian)
