= Ukrainian National Academy of Music =

Conservatory in Kyiv, Ukraine

Coordinates: 50°26′56″N 30°31′30″E

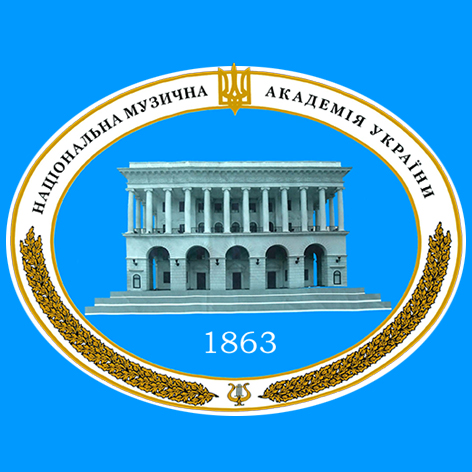
- Accreditation: Ministry of Education and Science of Ukraine
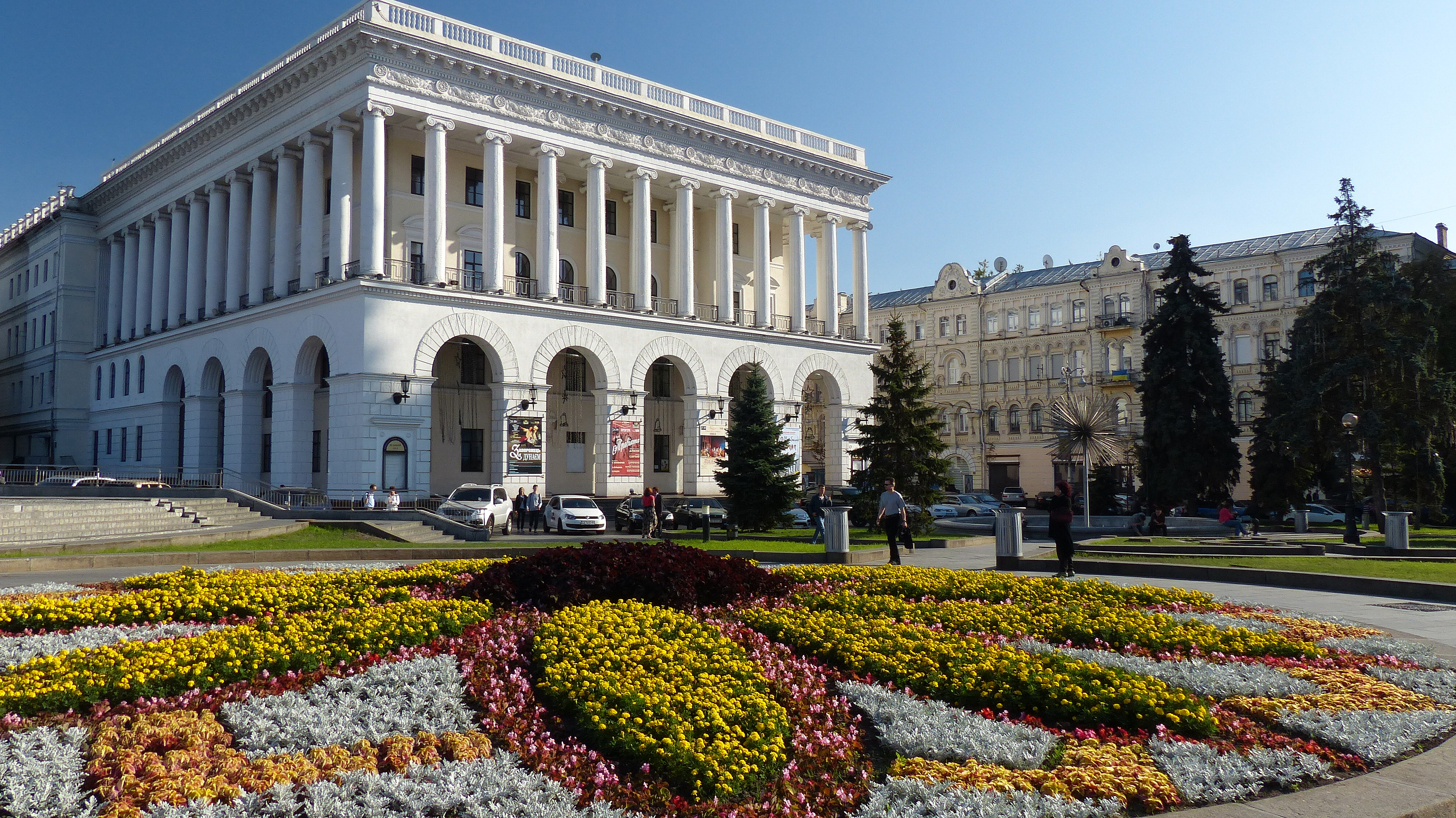

Immovable Monument of Local Significance of Ukraine
- Official name: Готель (консерваторія) (Hotel (conservatory))
- Type: Architecture
- Reference no.: 3292-Кв

The Ukrainian National Academy of Music (Ukrainian: Національна музична академія України, romanized: Natsionalna muzychna akademiia Ukrainy) is a national music tertiary academy at Architect Horodetsky Street in Kyiv, Ukraine. Its courses include postgraduate education.

From 1940 until December 2025, the conservatory was named Ukrainian National Tchaikovsky Academy of Music (Ukrainian: Національна музична академія України імені П. Чайковського, romanized: Natsionalna muzychna akademiia Ukrainy imeni P. Chaikovskoho). On 30 December 2025 the Ministry of Culture of Ukraine removed the name of the Russian composer Pyotr Ilyich Tchaikovsky from the name of the institution. Formerly it went by the name Kyiv Conservatory.

== History ==
The Kyiv Conservatory was founded on 3 November 1913 at the Kyiv campus of the Music College of the Russian Musical Society. The organization of the conservatory was spearheaded by Sergei Rachmaninoff and Alexander Glazunov. The first directors were V. Pukhalsky (1913) and Reinhold Glière (1914–1920). In 1925, the junior classes were separated from the conservatory to form a Music College, while the senior classes were merged into the formerly private Music and Drama Institute of Mykola Lysenko (today the Kyiv National I. K. Karpenko-Kary Theatre, Cinema and Television University). Viktor Kosenko taught at both institutions.

The conservatory was revived when Kyiv once again became the capital of Ukraine in 1934. The Music and Drama Institute of Mykola Lysenko was dissolved and its music department was merged back with the Music College, while the drama department served as the basis for creation of the Kyiv State Theater Institute of Les Kurbas. In 1938, the conservatory received the Order of Lenin award. In 1940, the conservatory was named after the Russian composer Pyotr Ilyich Tchaikovsky.

The conservatory occupies a building built in the 1890s as the Hotel Continental (built by architects Eduard Bradtman and Georg Schleifer). The building was destroyed during World War II, but was rebuilt in 1955, when a concert hall was added (architects L. Katok and Ya. Krasny). It is located on Architect Horodetsky Street 1-3/11.

In 1995, the President of Ukraine elevated the conservatory's status, and renamed it the Petro Tchaikovsky National Music Academy of Ukraine.

=== 2025 renaming of the conservatory ===
In 2022, after a full scale Russian invasion of Ukraine, the removal of Tchaikovsky's name from the conservatory was proposed. This renaming was then disputed by musicians and academics who claimed that Tchaikovsky was more Ukrainian than Russian because "his father came from a family of Zaporozhian Cossacks, and his mother was French". It was also claimed that Tchaikovsky "treated Ukraine with incredible love, evidenced by his music based on Ukrainian melodies." (Note: The argument that Pyotr Ilyich Tchaikovsky was a composer of Ukrainian heritage was criticised by professor Yurii Chekan as an example of "postcolonial thinking" and that Tchaikovsky could only be considered "1/8 Ukrainian.") Russian media then used this naming controversy in its disinformation campaign. In December 2022 the leadership of the conservatory voted against a name change.

In March 2023 students and teachers of the conservatory organised a protest in which they called for the removal of Tchaikovsky's name from the institute. And again in February 2024 graduates held a single picket in protest of Tchaikovsky's name still being associated with the conservatory.

On 30 December 2025 the Ministry of Culture of Ukraine announced that the conservatory was no longer named after Tchaikovsky. According to the ministry the use Tchaikovsky's name in the name of the institution was a symbol of Russian imperial policy and therefore did not comply with Ukrainian legislation. The ministry also stated that the conservatory would get a new official name "after public discussion with the staff of the institution, experts and the public."

== Rectors ==
- 1913–1914 Vladimir Pukhalskiy
- 1914–1920 Reinhold Glière
- 1920–1922 Felix Blumenfeld
- 1922–1926 Kostiantyn Mykhailov
- 1926–1934 unknown
- 1934–1948 Abram Lufer (including the evacuation period)
- 1948–1954 Oleksandr Klymov
- 1954–1968 Andriy Shtoharenko
- 1968–1974 Ivan Lyashenko
- 1974–1983 Mykola Kondratyuk
- 1983–2004 Oleg Tymoshenko
- 2004– 2018 Volodymyr Rozhok
- 2018– Maksym Tymoshenko

== Honorary Professors of the Academy ==
- Riccardo Muti
- Placido Domingo
- Jack Ma
- Oleh V. Krysa
- Esteban Valverde Corrales
- Mykola Suk
- Ye Xiaogang
- Jerzy Stankiewicz

== See also ==
List of universities in Ukraine
