= Architect Horodetsky Street =

Street in Kyiv

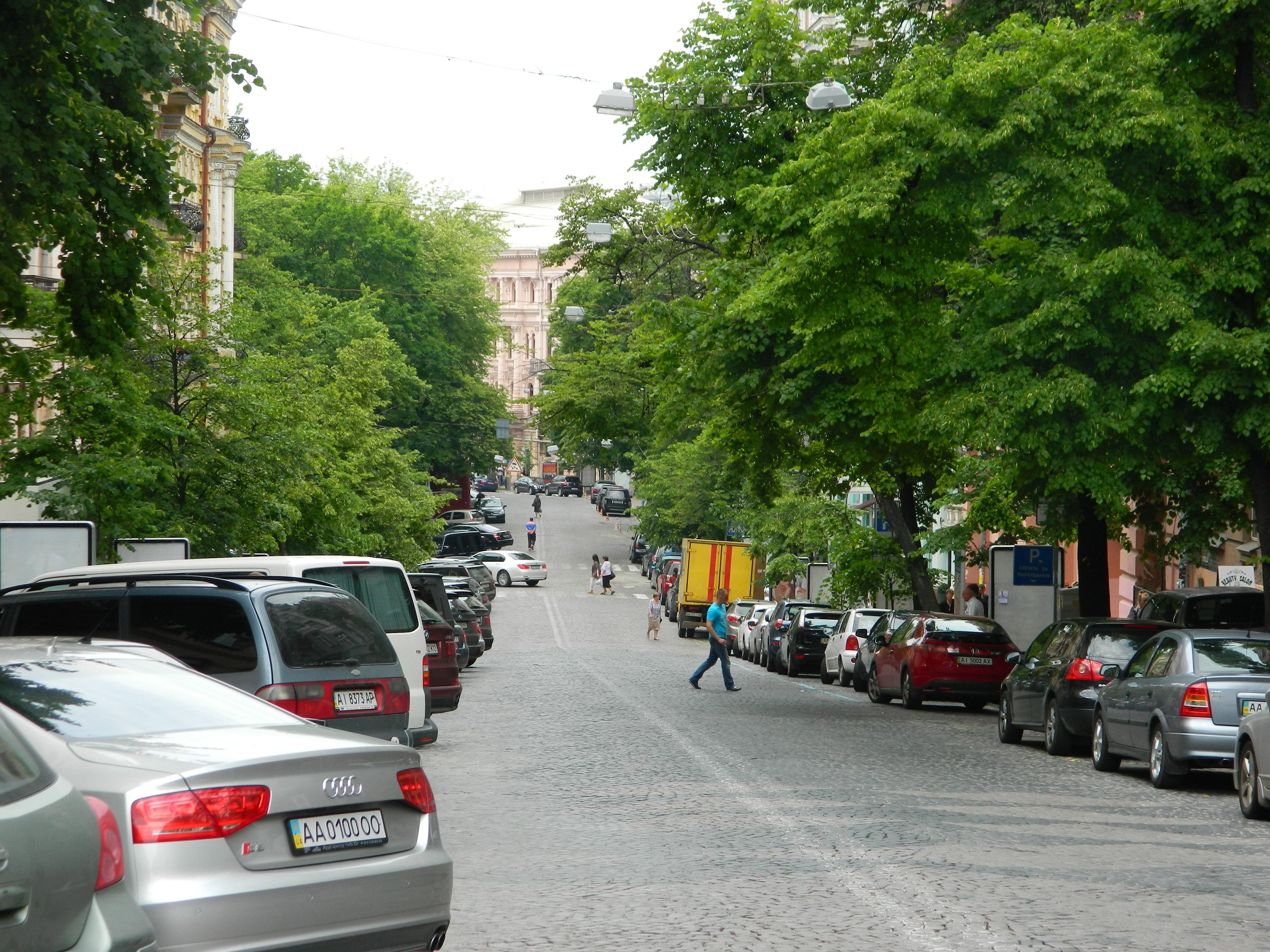
- Architect Horodetsky Street, May 2014
- Native name: Вулиця Архітектора Городецького (Ukrainian)
- Namesake: Vladyslav Horodetsky
- Length: 405 m (1,329 ft)
- Location: Lypky, Pecherskyi District, Kyiv, Ukraine
- Postal code: 01001, 01601
- Coordinates: 50°26′45.7″N 30°31′40.4″E

Architect Horodetsky Street or Arkhitektora Horodetskoho Street (Ukrainian: Вулиця Архітектора Городецького, romanized: Vulytsa Arkhitektora Horodetskoho) is a street in the Pecherskyi District of Kyiv, part of the wider Lypky neighbourhood at the site of the former Friedrich Mering estate. It runs from Khreshchatyk to Ivan Franko Square. The Zankovetska and Olhynska streets are connected to it.

The street is named in honour of architect Vladyslav Horodetsky, who designed many of Kyiv's iconic buildings, including the Ukrainian National Academy of Music in this street.

== History ==
The street was established in 1895 as part of the development of the former garden and estate of Friedrich Mering, a professor at Kyiv University, as one of the newly laid-out streets, named Mykolaivska Street, in honour of Emperor Nicholas II (Ukrainian: Mykola II).

In March 1919, it was named Marx Street. In September 1919, the street was given back its previous name, but from January 1920 onwards, it was known as Karl Marx Street. During the German occupation of the city in 1941–1943, the street was once again called Mykolaivska, but after the Soviets retook Kyiv, the name Karl Marx Street was confirmed in 1944.

The street was given its current name Architect Horodetsky Street in 1996, in recognition of Vladyslav Horodetsky's role in shaping the architectural character of this part of the city.

== Development ==
The street was developed over a period of 5–7 years by prominent professional architects: Heorhiy Schleifer, Eduard Bradtman and Vladyslav Horodetsky. The street was immediately paved with high-quality cobblestones. By 1897, part of the street had already been built up, with both residential tenement blocks and buildings serving other purposes, such as the Continental Hotel, the Rabotnyk Society building, and Joseph Kimayer's furniture factory.

In 1903, a unique building, Krutikov Circus (or Hippo-Palace), appeared on the corner of the streets; it was the only two-storey circus building in Europe at the time. Thus, by the beginning of the 20th century, a unique ensemble of luxurious residential and public buildings had emerged, significantly different from the rest of the city. Consequently, this part of the city received the nickname "Kyivan Paris" (Ukrainian: Київський Париж, romanized: Kyivsky Paryzh).

The war years inflicted a number of irreparable losses on the city: the buildings along Khreshchatyk were almost completely destroyed, and the neighbouring streets, including this one, were also affected. The Krutikov Circus building (No. 7) was destroyed, as were the corner houses Nos. 1 and 2 and house No. 3, where Vladyslav Horodetsky once lived; almost all the other houses were also damaged (they were burnt down, but were rebuilt after the war). The Continental Hotel building was partially restored.

After the war, the burnt-out buildings were rebuilt. In 1964, the "Ukraine" cinema was built on the site of the destroyed Krutikov Circus. This building has a different architectural style, which does not blend in with the rest of the street's buildings.

== Architectural landmarks ==
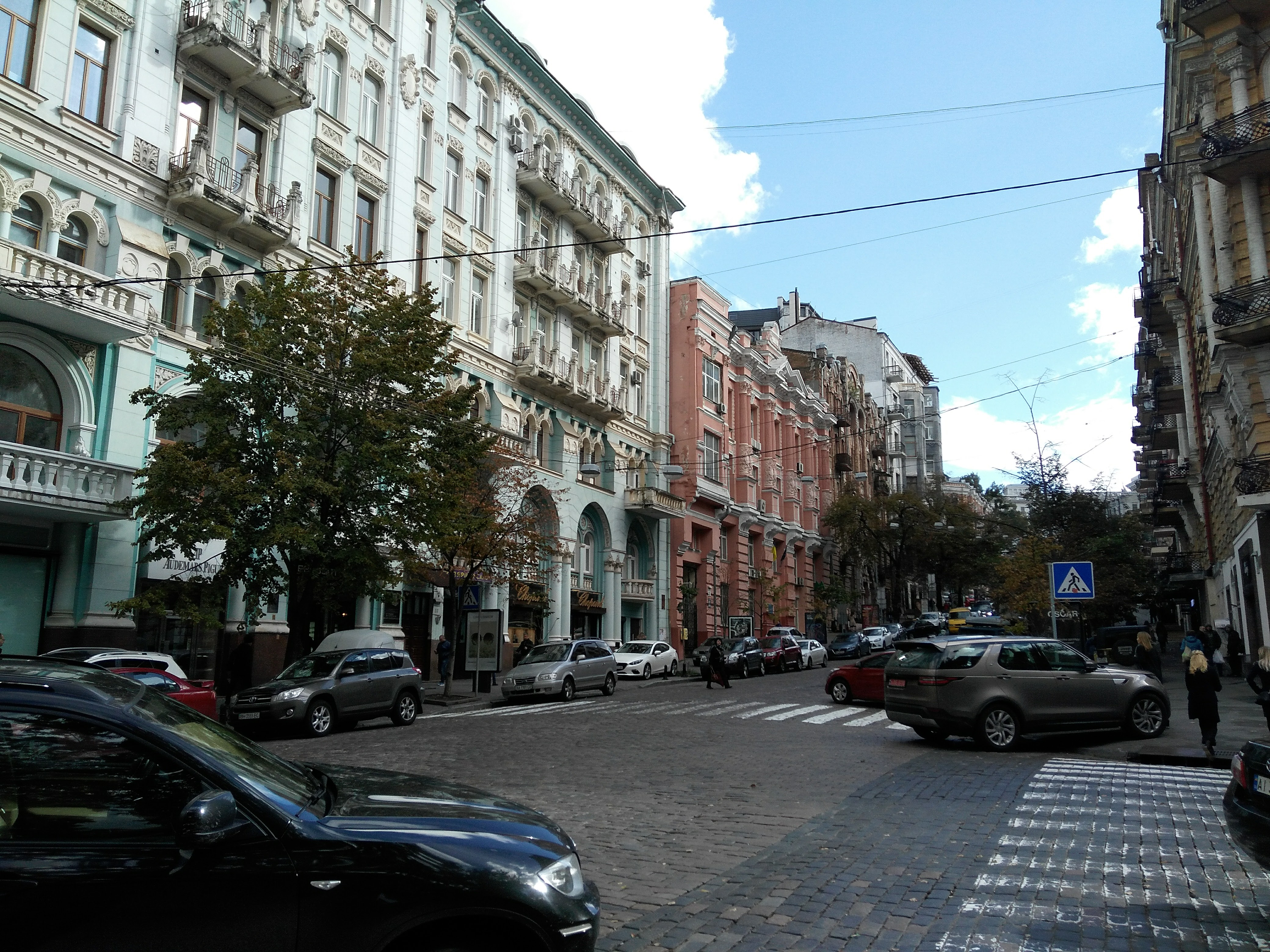
Architect Horodetsky Street in 2017

- № 1–3/11: Ukrainian National Academy of Music, originally the Continental Hotel (1895–1897, architects Heorhiy (George) Schleifer, Vladyslav Horodetsky and Eduard Bradtman; 1950s, restoration, architects Lev Katok, Y. Krasny, M. Liberberg);
- № 4 and 6: rental properties (1897) general Baskakov: historicism with elements of the Neo-Renaissance;
- № 5: Cinema "Ukraine" (Кінотеатр Україна, built 1964 on the spot of the former Petro Krutikov Circus 1903–1945; closed in 2019). In September 1965, at the premiere of the film Shadows of Forgotten Ancestors in the Kyiv cinema "Ukraine", Ivan Dziuba, Vasyl Stus and Viacheslav Chornovil jointly publicly protested against the 1965–1966 Ukrainian purge here, and Dziuba wrote Internationalism or Russification? soon after;
- № 9: Hinzburh Building (1900–1901, architects Heorhiy Schleifer and Eduard Bradtman, engineer and owner Lev Hinzburh, whose ancestors came from Günzburg);
- № 10/1: on the corner of Zankovetska Street, an apartment block belonging to the wife of merchant M. V. Pochtar (1900, architect Mykola Yaskevych);
- № 11а: the Rabotnyk society building (1896, architect Vladyslav Horodetsky; 1911 extension, architect Eduard Bradtman);
- № 12/2/3: on the corner of Ivan Franko Square and Bohdan Stupka Street, A. F. Berliner’s apartment block (1909, architect Mykola Yaskevych);
- № 13: Josyf (Joseph) Kimayer commercial building and trading house; the current main building of the Ministry of Justice of Ukraine (1897, architects Martyn Kluh and Vladyslav Horodetsky);
- № 15: Baron Hesselbein House (1901–1903);
- № 17/1: on the corner of Olhynska Street, an apartment block designed by Vsevolod Demchenko (1909, architect Ivan Belyaev).
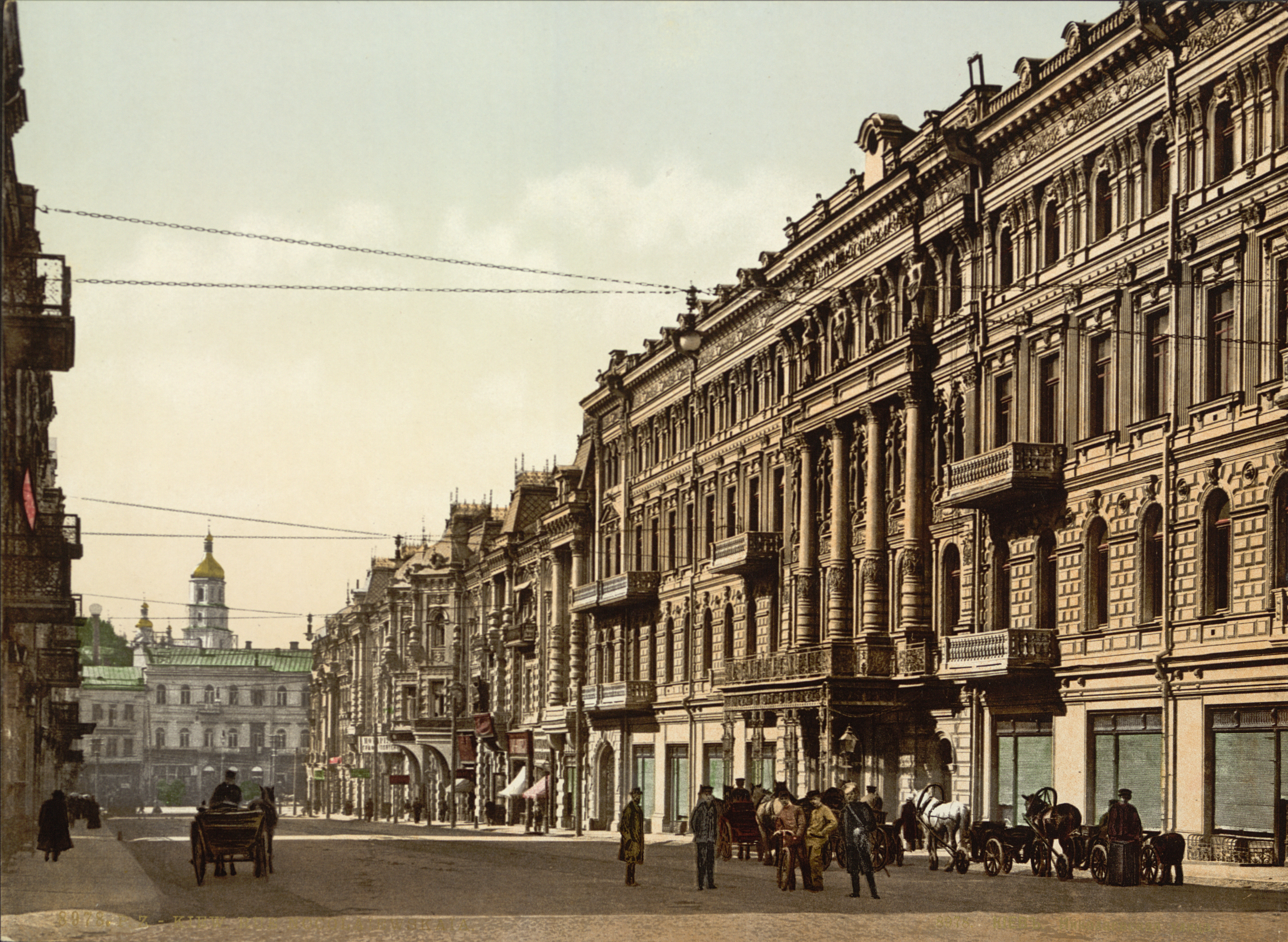
Mykolaivska Street, early 20th century

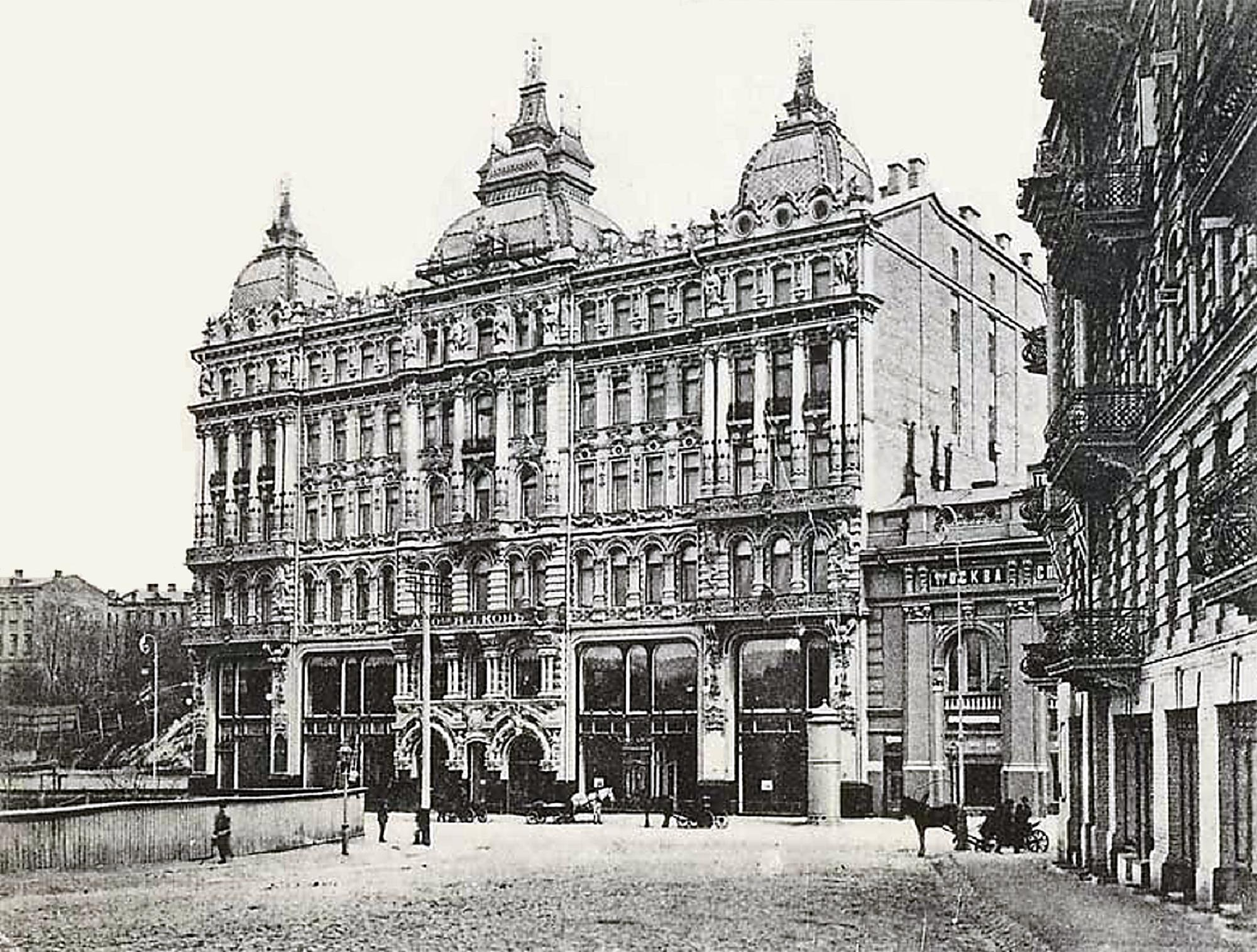
The Hinzburh House (No. 9)

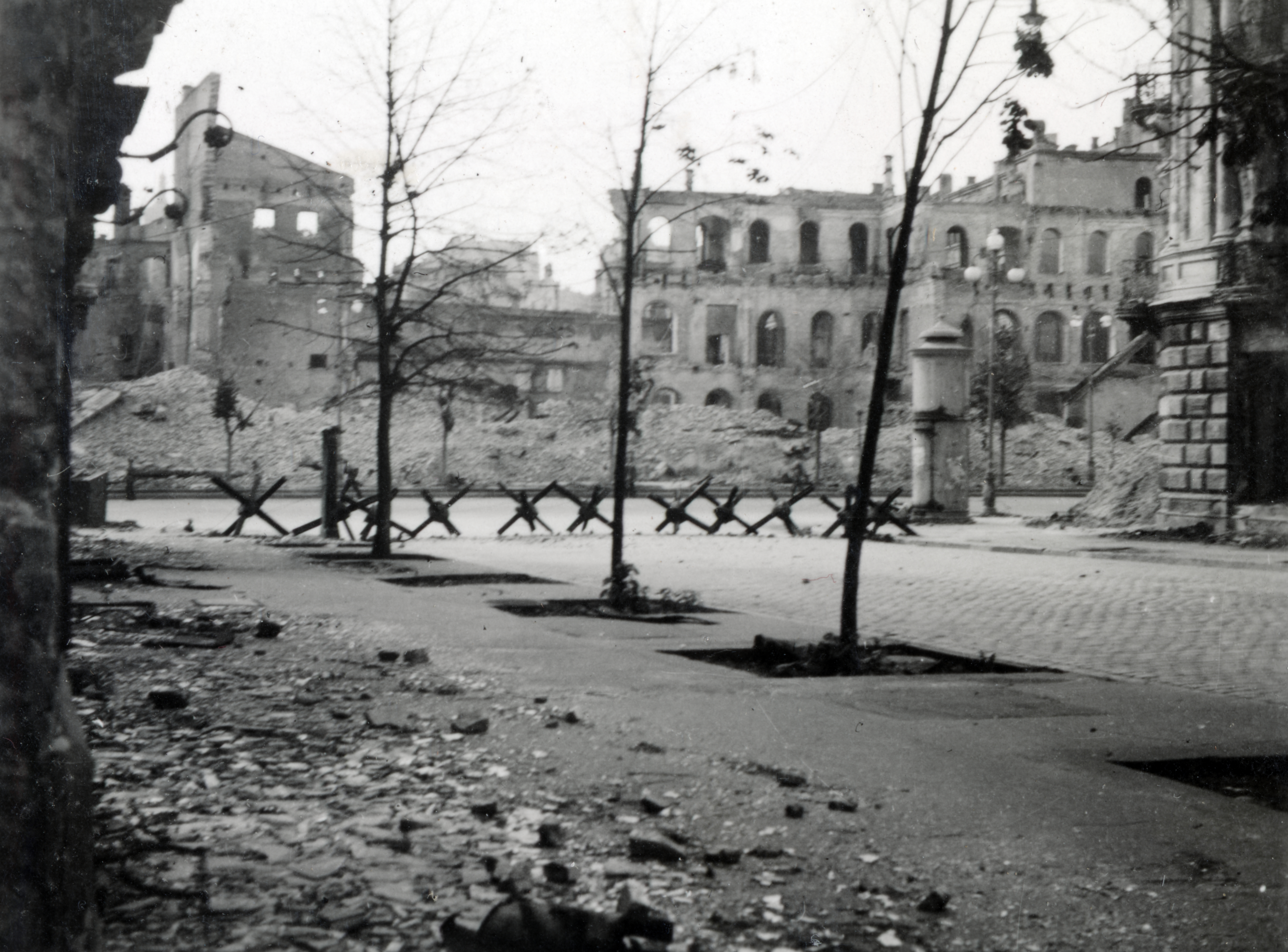
The junction of Mykolaivska Street and Khreshchatyk, 1942

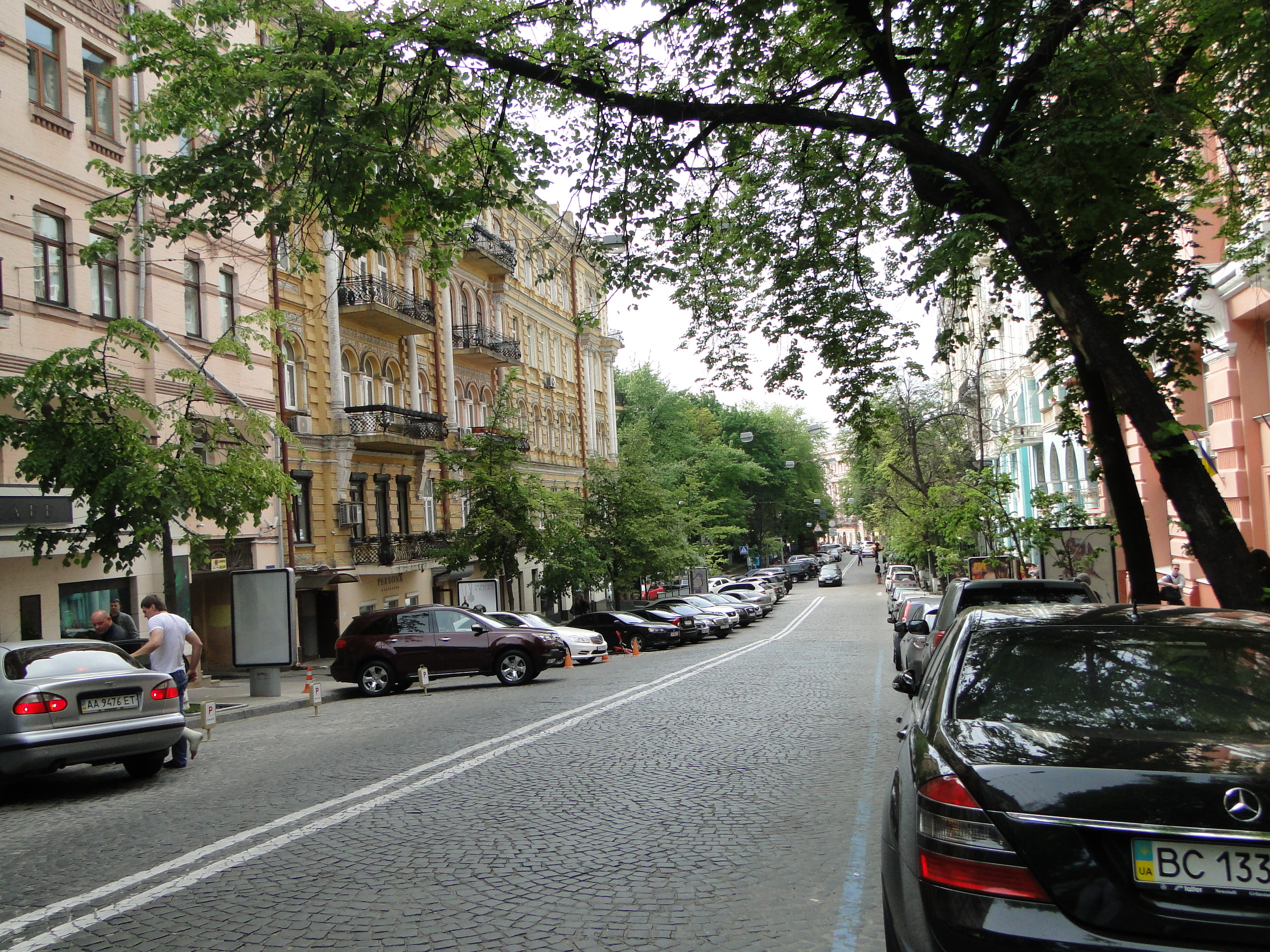
Horodetsky Street (May 2012)

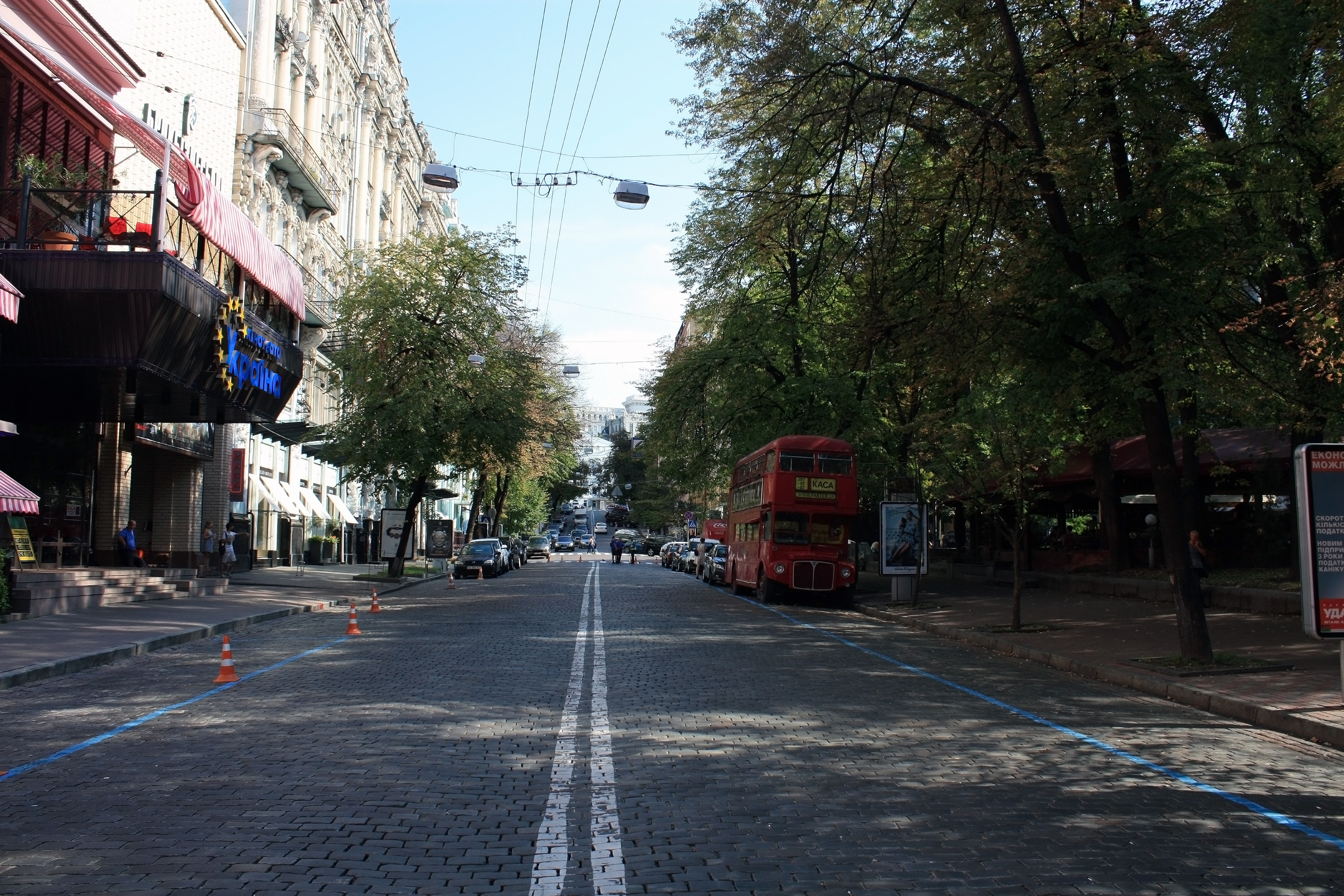
Horodetsky Street (August 2012)

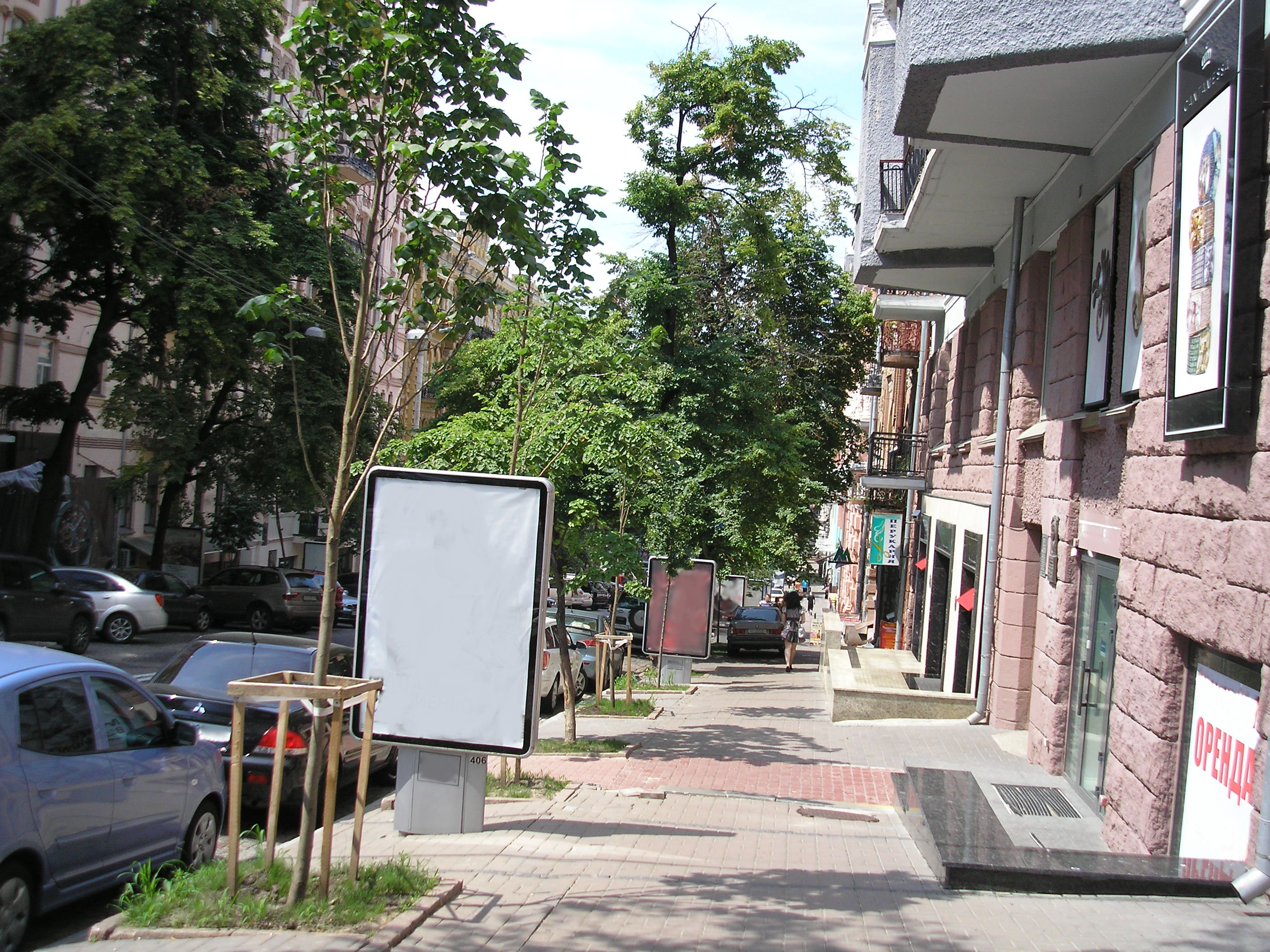
Horodetsky Street (June 2013)

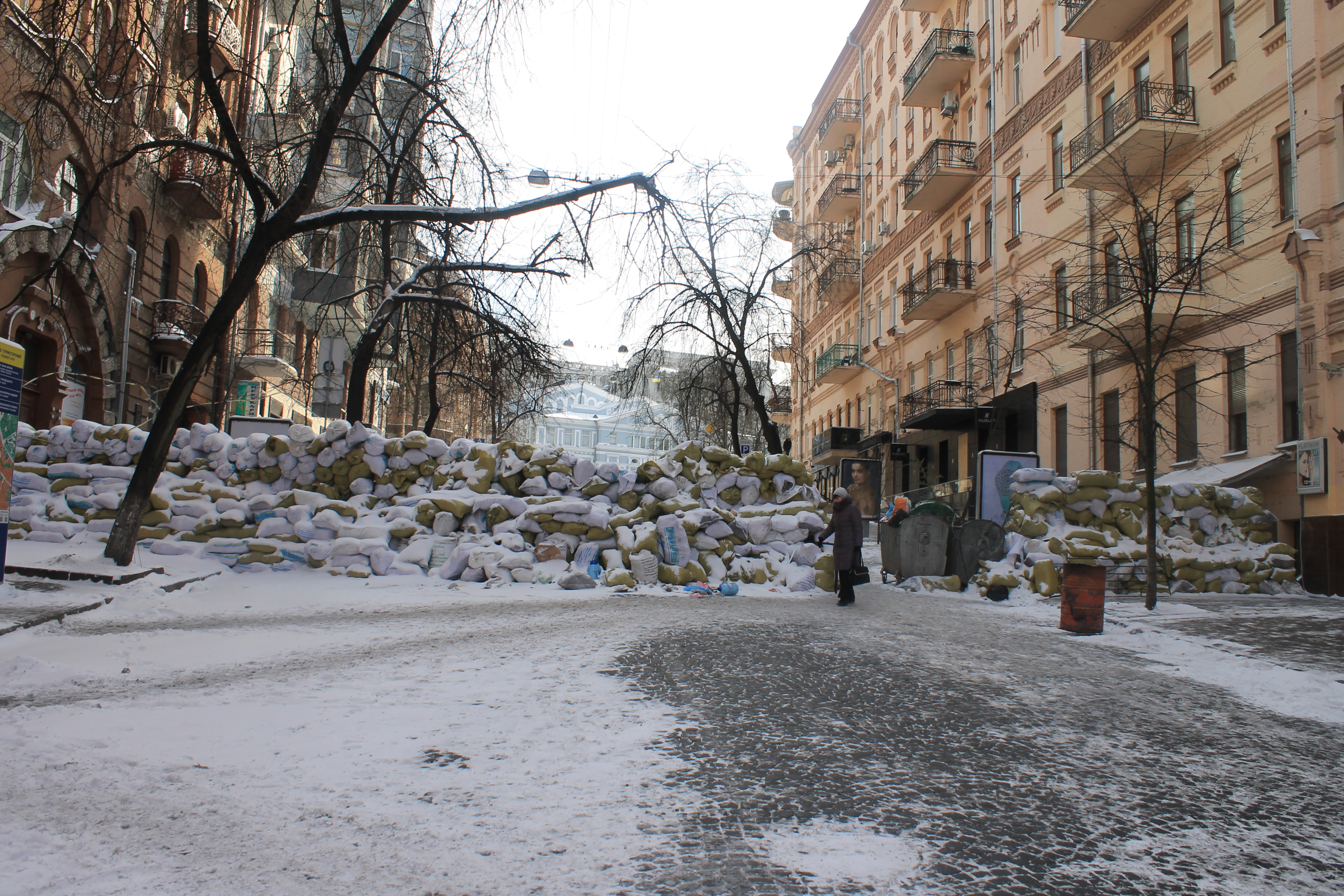
Euromaidan barricade in January 2014

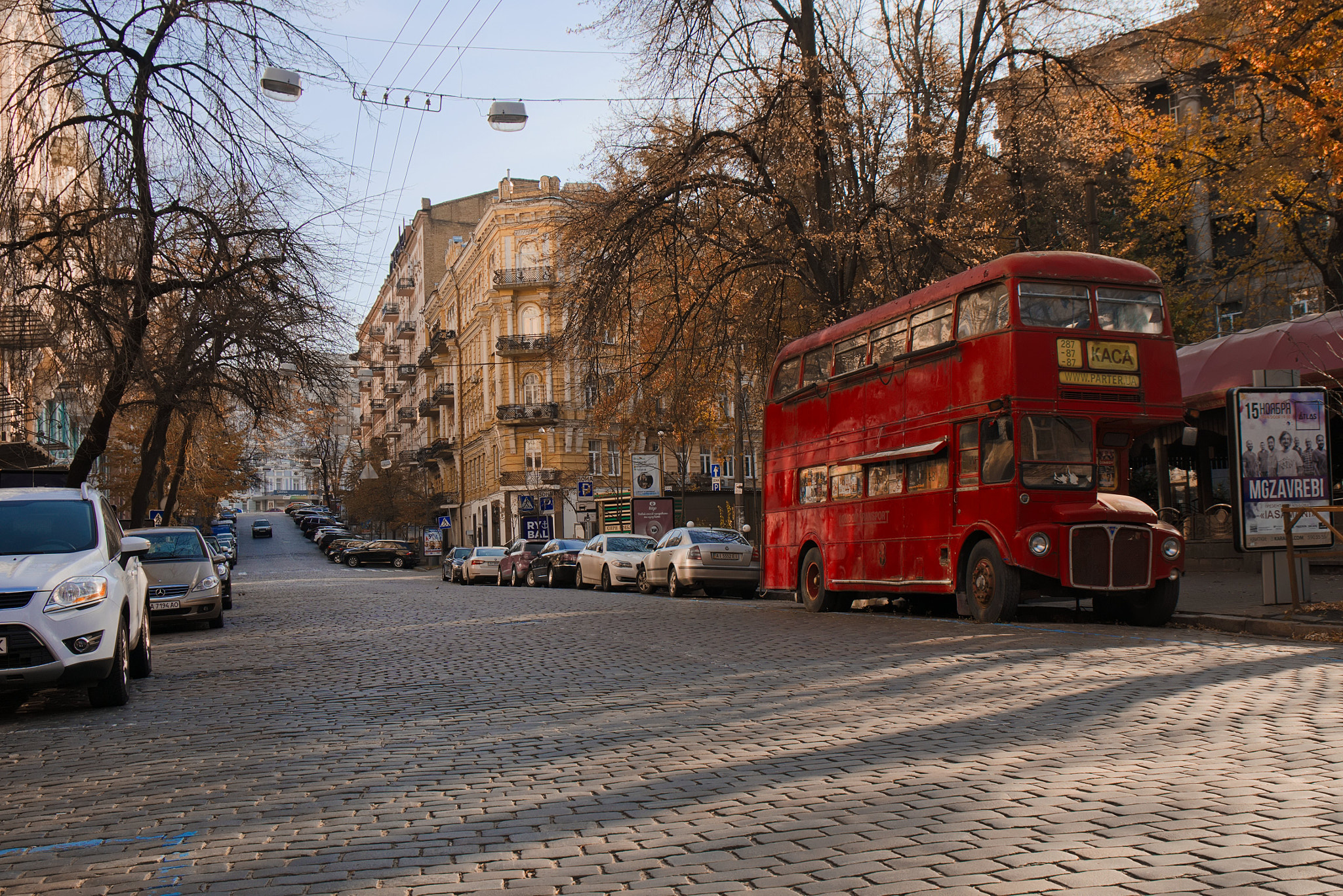
Red bus, February 2017

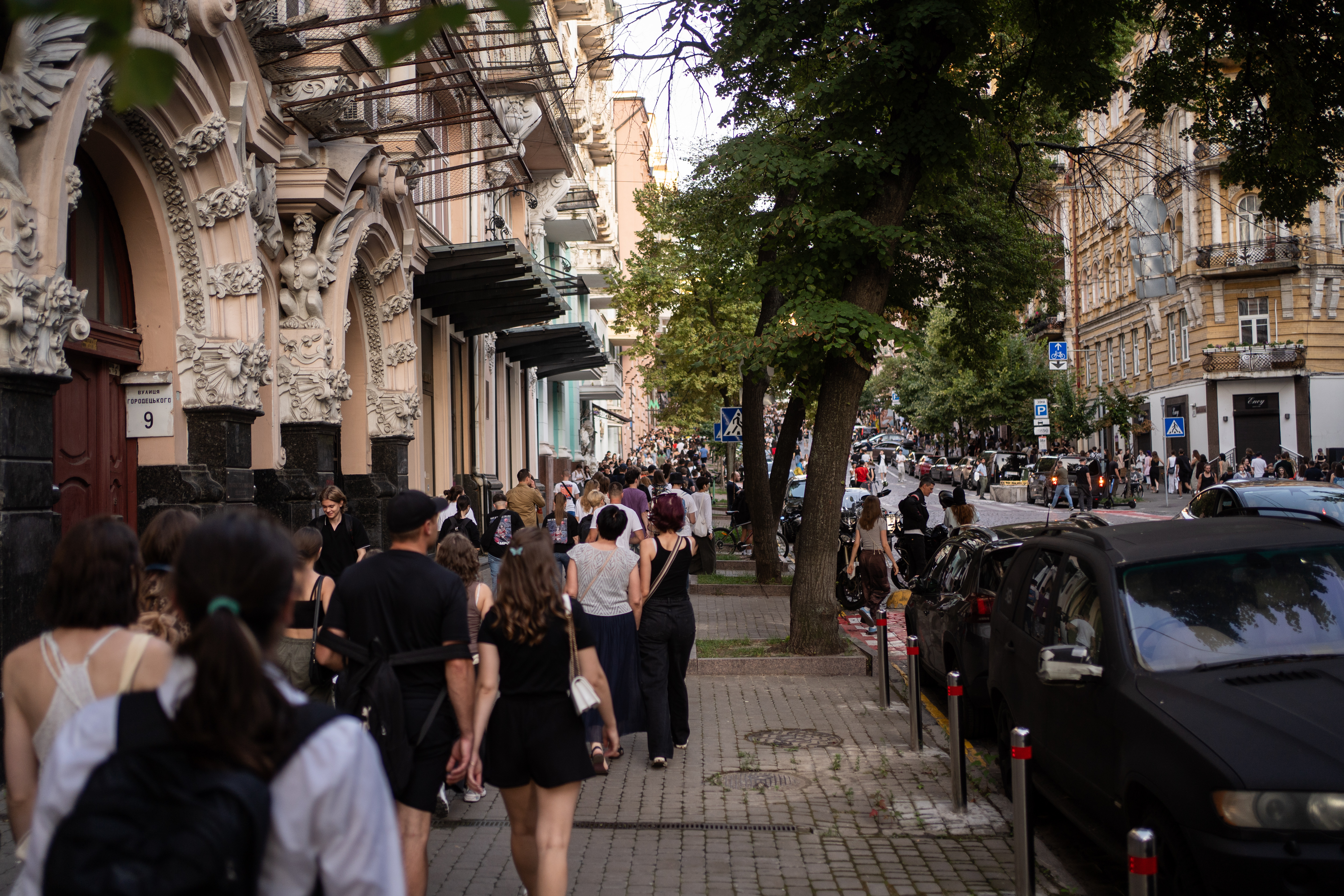
2025 anti-corruption protests in Ukraine

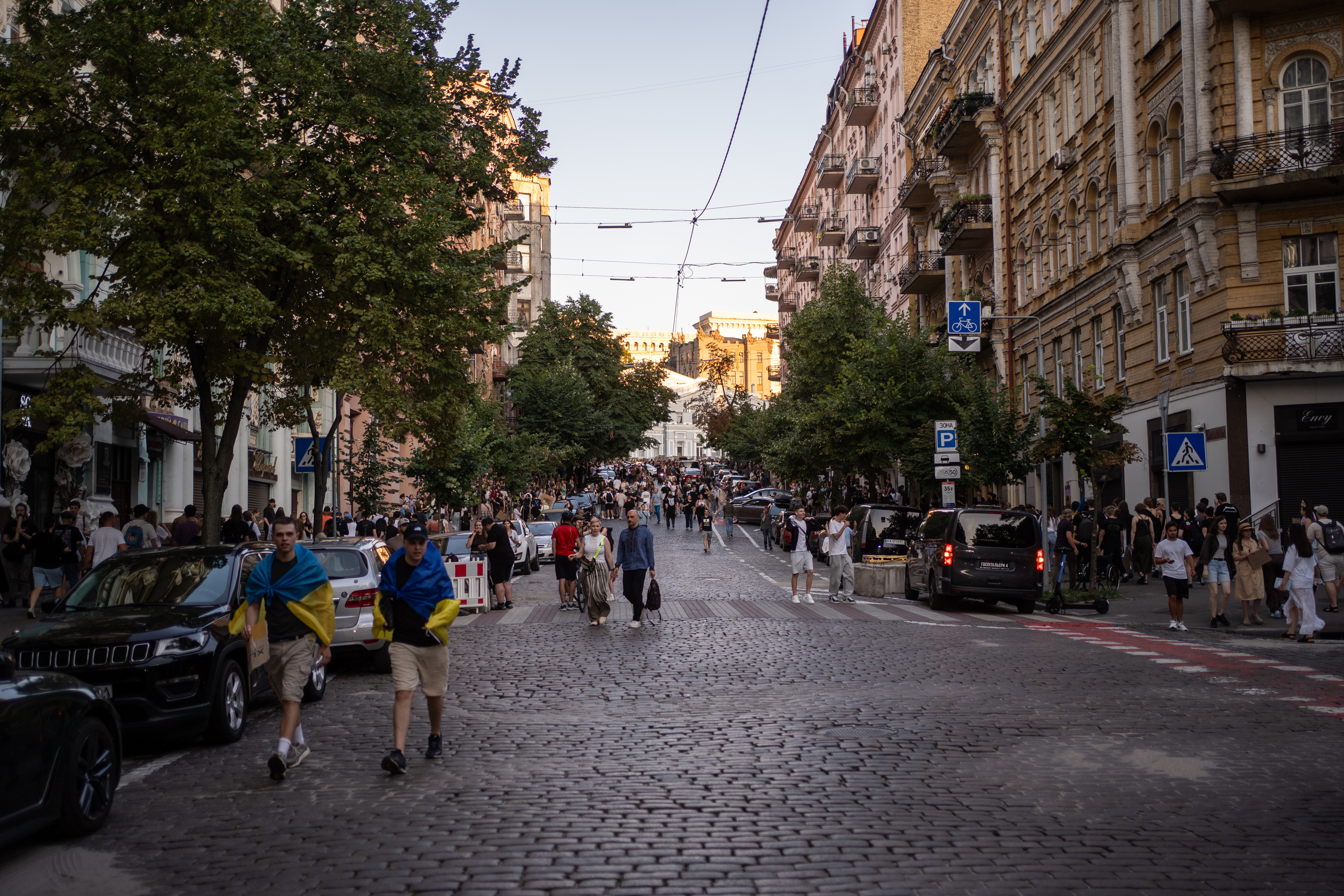
2025 anti-corruption protests in Ukraine

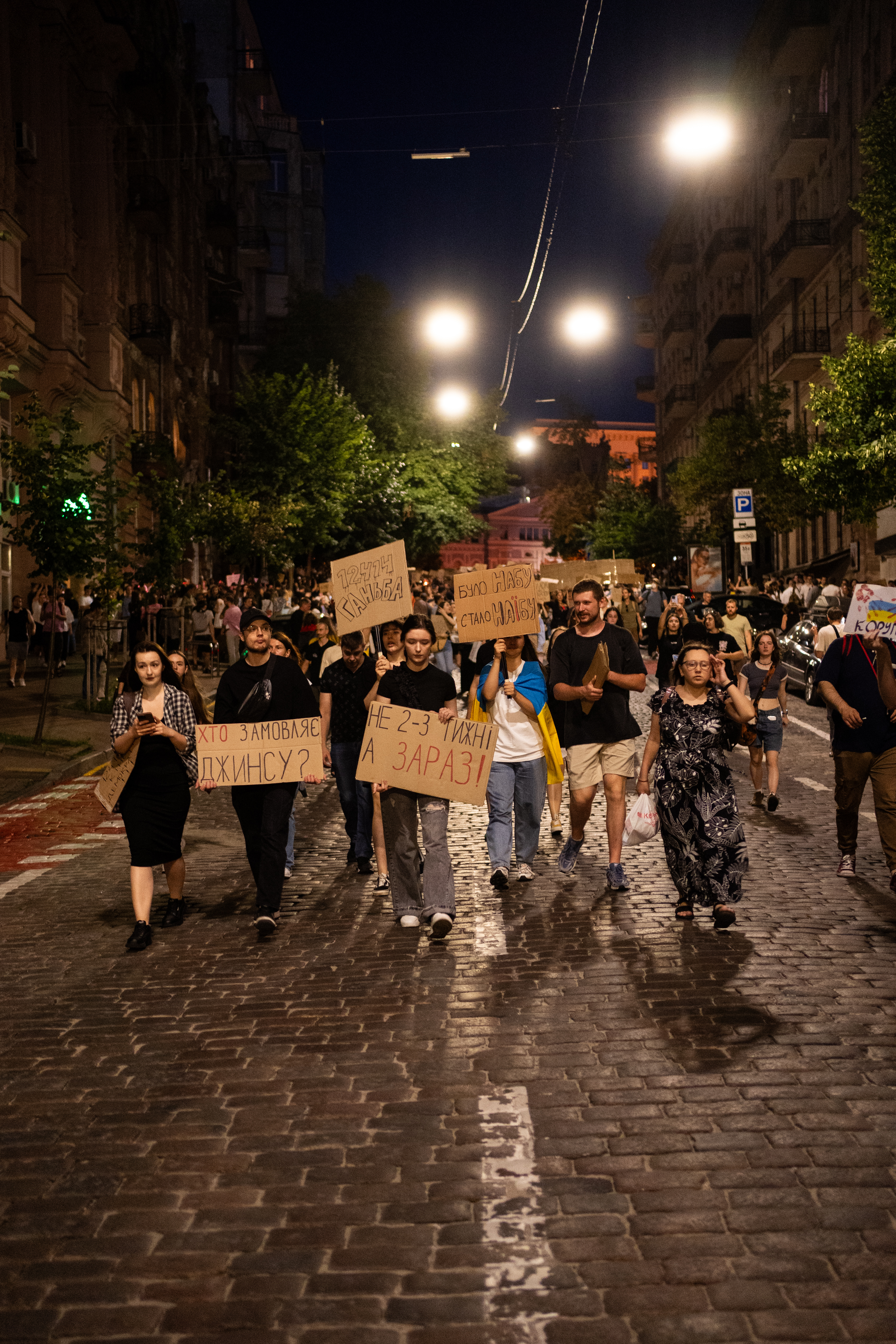
2025 anti-corruption protests in Ukraine

== Bibliography ==
=== Compendium of Historical and Cultural Monuments of Ukraine ===
- Smolii, V. A., ed. (1999). Звід пам'яток історії та культури України [Compendium of Historical and Cultural Monuments of Ukraine] (in Ukrainian). Kyiv: "Ukrainian Encyclopedia" named after M. P. Bazhan.
  - Havryliuk, Larysa; Skibitska, Tetyana. "Житловий будинок 1909, в якому проживали Пономаренко Є. П., Ужвій Н. М. (Residential building 1909, in which Y. P. Ponomarenko and N. M. Uzhviy lived)". In Smolii (1999), Book 1 Part І, pp. 319–320.
  - Kalnytskyi, Mykhailo; Kovalenko, Nina; Lysenko, Ivan; Skibitska, Tetyana. "Київська консерваторія (Національна музична академія України ім. П. Чайковського). кін. 19–20 ст. (Kyiv Conservatory (National Music Academy of Ukraine named after P. Tchaikovsky). late 19th–20th centuries)". In Smolii (1999), Book 1 Part І, pp. 320–321.
  - Kalnytskyi, Mykhailo; Malakov, Dmytro; Skibitska, Tetyana. "Житловий будинок 1900–1901, в якому проживав Зілов П. О. (Residential building 1900–1901, where Zilov P. O. lived)". In Smolii (1999), Book 1 Part І, pp. 318–319.
  - Kalnytskyi, Mykhailo; Ostashko, Tetyana; Popovych, Serhii; Skibitska, Tetyana. "Будинок сільськогосподарського кооперативу «Робітник» в якому містилися військові міністерства Української Держави та Української Народної Республіки, проживали Вєтров Ю. О., Греків О. П., Крушельницький М. М., Плехов М. Д. (The building of the agricultural cooperative "Robitnyk", which housed the military ministries of the Ukrainian State and the Ukrainian People's Republic, was inhabited by Yu. O. Vetrov, O. P. Grekiv, M. M. Krushelnytskyi, and M. D. Plekhov.)". In Smolii (1999), Book 1 Part І, pp. 316–317.
  - Kalnytskyi, Mykhailo; Tolochko, Larysa. "Городецького Архітектора вулиця, рубіж 19–20 ст. (Gorodetsky Architect Street, turn of the 19th–20th centuries)". In Smolii (1999), Book 1 Part І, pp. 315–316.
  - Kalnytskyi, Mykhailo. "Житловий будинок, в якому проживав Любомирський Г. Л. (The residential building where Lubomirskyi G. L. lived)". In Smolii (1999), Book 1 Part І, p. 319.
  - Malakov, Dmytro; Skibitska, Tetyana. "Торговельний будинок меблевої фірми Й. Кімаєра, 1895–97 (J. Kimayer's furniture company trading house, 1895–97)". In Smolii (1999), Book 1 Part І, p. 321.
  - Skibitska, Tetyana. "Житловий будинок, поч. 20 ст. (Residential building, early 20th century.)". In Smolii (1999), Book 1 Part І, pp. 317–318.

=== Video ===
- Старий Київ. Вулиця Архітектора Городецького — київський Париж on YouTube [Old Kyiv. Architect Horodetsky Street — Kyivan Paris]
- Старий Київ. Творчий оазис на вулиці Архітектора Городецького on YouTube [Old Kyiv. A creative oasis on Architect Horodetsky Street]

== Sources ==
- Web encyclopedia of Kyiv.
- "Карла Маркса вул.". In: Streets of Kyiv: a handbook. Compiled by A. M. Syhalov and others. Kyiv: Reklama [Advertising], 1975. p. 104.
- Kudrytskyi, Anatolii Viktorovych; Ponomarenko, Lidiya Antonivna; Riznyk, Oleksandr (1995). Вулиці Києва. Довідник [Streets of Kyiv: a handbook] (in Ukrainian). Kyiv: Ukrainska Entsyklopediia Imeni M.P. Bazhana. p. 133. ISBN 5-88500-070-0.
- "Karl Marx Street". In: Kyiv: An Encyclopedic Handbook (1982), p. 340. ed. A. V. Kudrytsky. Kyiv. (in Russian).
- Городецького Архітектора вулиця [Architect Horodetsky Street]. In: Streets of Kyiv: Official Handbook. Appendix to the decision of the Kyiv City Council dated 22 January 2015 No. 34/899 “On approval of the official handbook “Streets of Kyiv City””. p. 54.
