= Yurii Chekan =

Ukrainian musicologist

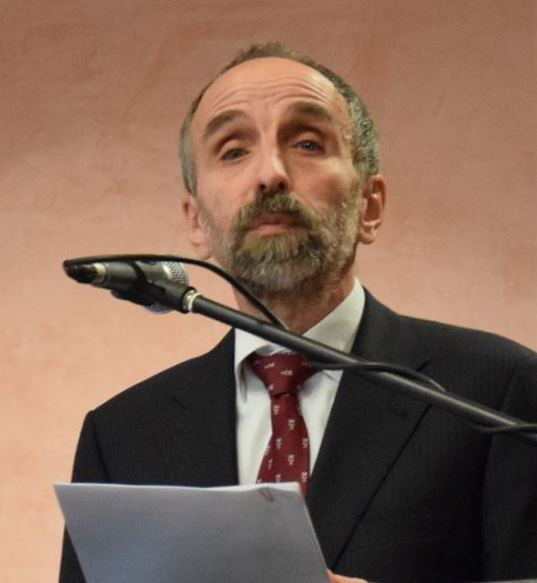
Image of Yurii Chekan

Yurii Ivanovych Chekan (born February 8, 1960) is a Ukrainian musicologist, doctor of art history and member of the National Union of Composers of Ukraine.

== Biography ==
He was born on February 8, 1960, in the city of Uzhhorod, Zakarpattia, Ukraine.

In 1984, he graduated from the Faculty of History and Theory at the Kyiv Conservatory. In 1992, he completed his postgraduate studies with the PhD thesis "Historical-functional studies of musical works (on the example of Tchaikovsky's Sixth Symphony)". In 2011, having defended his dissertation "Intonation of the world as a category of historical musicology," he received his Doctor of Arts. In 2001, he graduated from Taras Shevchenko Kyiv National University's Institute of International Relations with a master's degree in International Law.

=== Work ===
In 1984, Yuriy Chekan began to work as a teacher of theoretical disciplines at the Uzhgorod music school. Later, from 1986–2000, he worked as a senior lecturer as well as Associate Professor and Head of the Department of theory and history of music at the Nizhyn Pedagogical Institute. He was an associate professor and acting professor at the National Music Academy of Ukraine beginning in 2000. He taught at the Kyiv Slavic University, the Glier school, and the Luhansk Academy of Culture and Arts. In addition, he was editor-in-chief of Art-line magazine from 1996–2000; head of the information and analytical department of the Foundation for assistance and development of the arts from 2000–2002; legal adviser to the editorial board of the magazine "Knizhnik-Review" from 2003–2004; director and editor-in-chief of LLC "Vremya Publishing House" from 2004–2012; director of the A. Shtogarenko Charitable Foundation from 2002–2005, and administrator of the National Chamber Ensemble "Kyiv soloists" from 2015–2016. He ran for the position of rector of NMAU in an election. In the first round of voting on September 20, 2018, he received 111 votes (22.3%), leaving him in second place out of six candidates. In the second round, he received 141 votes (28.3%), leading him to lose the election to Maxim Tymoshenko.

=== Research activities ===
Chekan is a co-author of the textbook "Music Criticism". He is also a co-author of "Romano Drom", a book on the culture of Ukrainian Romani. He wrote the monograph "Intonation image of the world" (K., 2009). He is the author of over 50 scientific articles, over 500 music-critical articles, and more than 20 booklets for CDs with recordings of Ukrainian music.

== Awards ==
On March 22, 2013, Chekan was awarded the Prize named after M.V. Lysenko for musicological works of 2007–2012 and achievements in pedagogical activity.

== See also ==
- Musicology
- Kyiv Conservatory
- Taras Shevchenko National University of Kyiv
