= Arkada Bank =

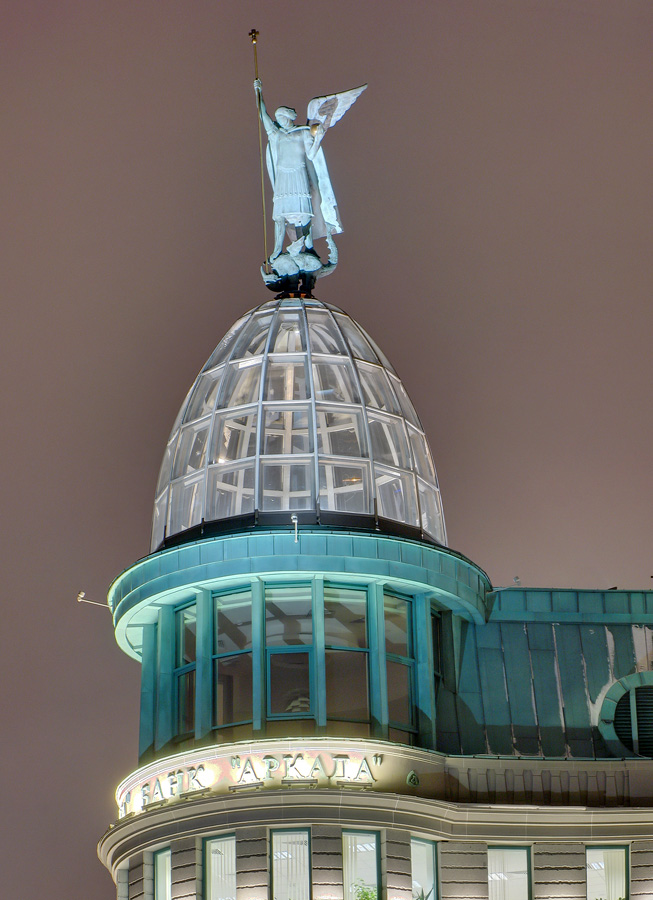
- The iconic archangel Michael sculpture (by Yuri Bahalika) on the Arkada Bank tower, pictured in December 2008
- Industry: Financial services
- Fate: Bank was declared insolvent in 2020 and its liquidation will be completed in 2023.
- Headquarters: Instytutska Street (since 2014: Alley of Heroes of the Heavenly Hundred) and Olhynska Street, Kyiv, Ukraine
- Services: Banking

Arkada Bank (Ukrainian: банк "Аркада") was a public joint stock bank based in Ukraine. Its head office was situated in Kyiv.

The bank was declared insolvent in 2020, and while its liquidation was expected to be completed in 2023, it was in fact finalized in the summer of 2024. A criminal case for the embezzlement of ₴9 billion of funds for financing the construction of Arkada Bank was ongoing as of September 2020. More than 90% of the bank's depositors (more than 5,000 people) would be refunded their deposits in full.

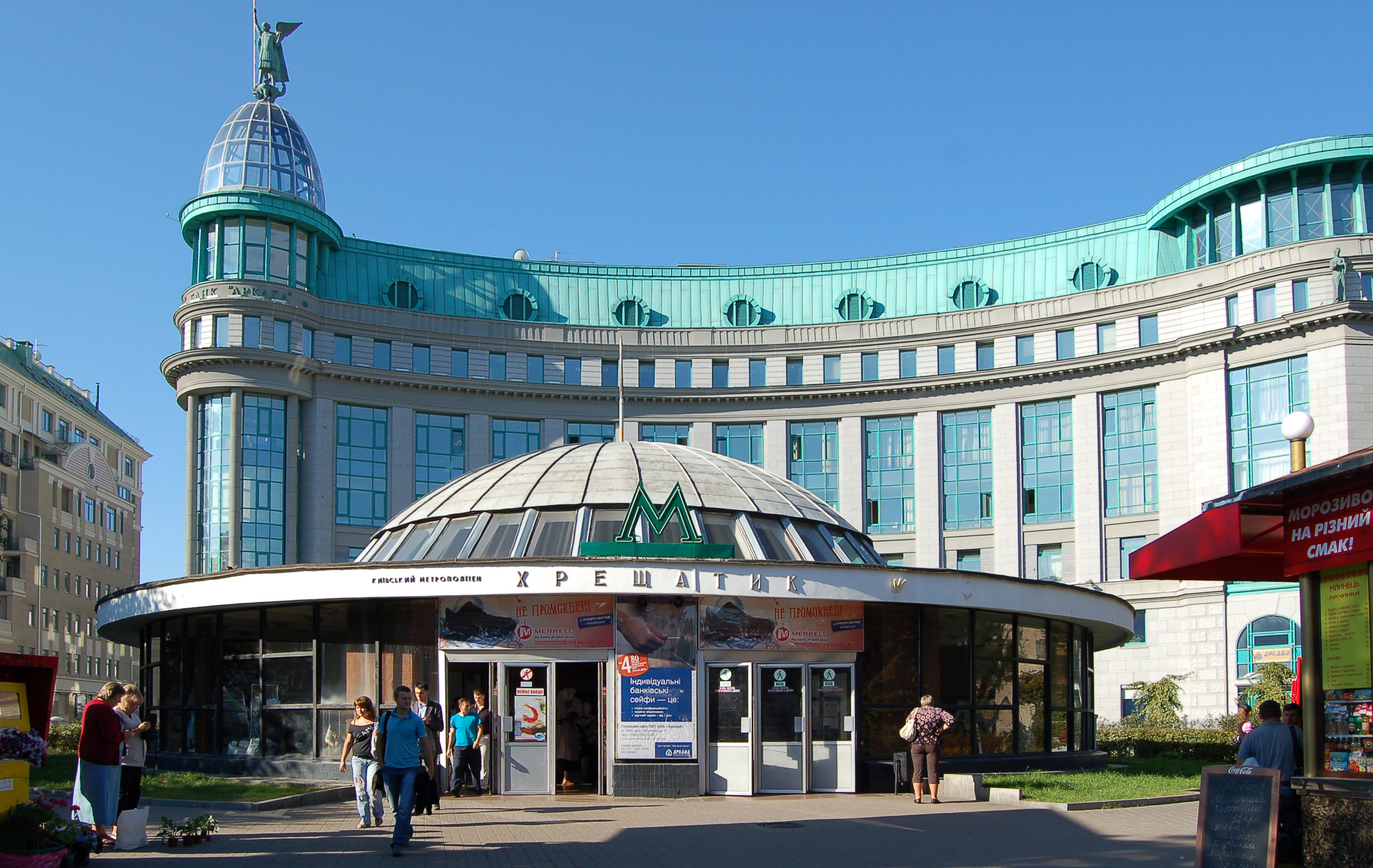
Arkada Bank building behind the Khreschatyk metro station (August 2011)

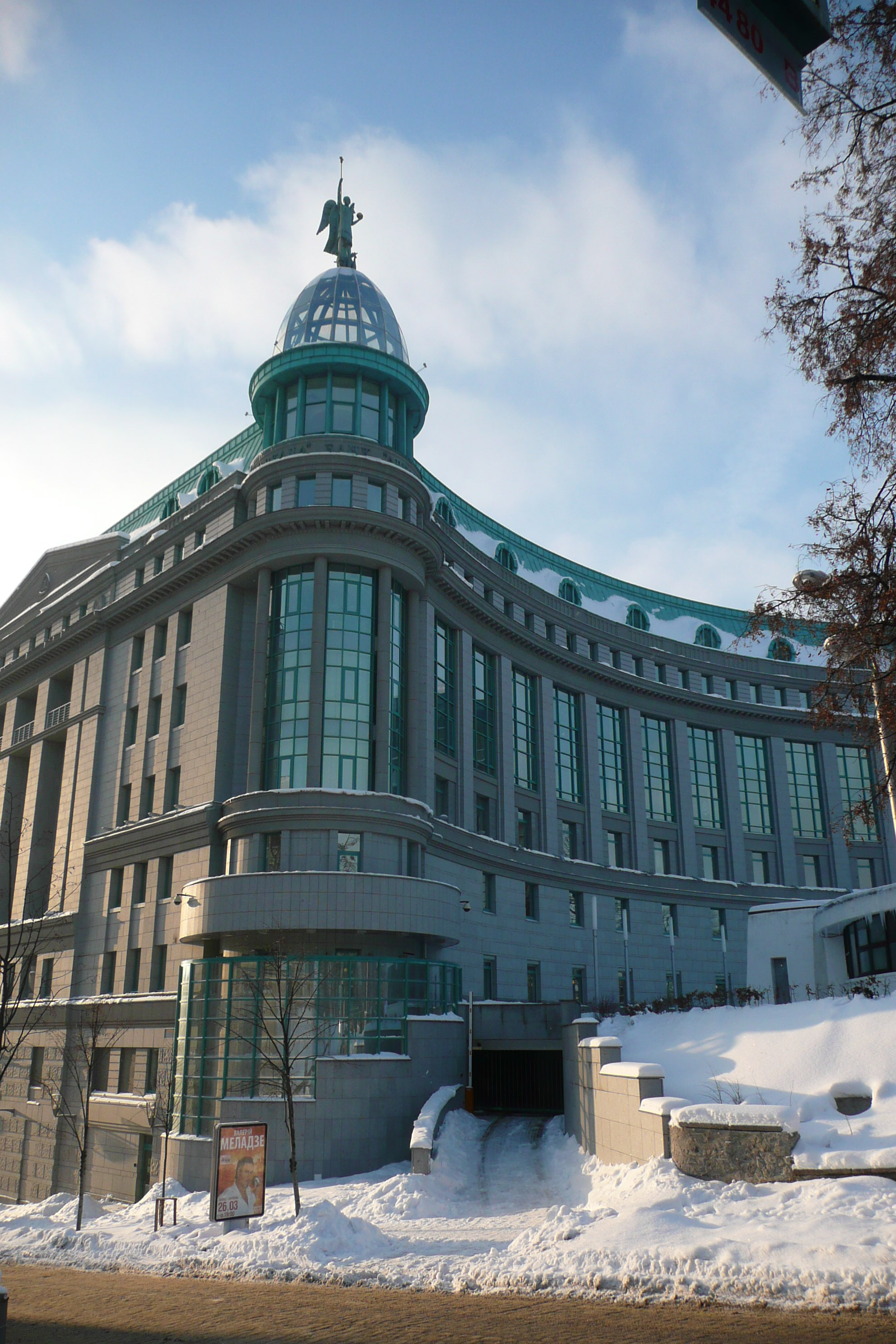
The Arkada Bank building at Olhynska Street in Kyiv, pictured in January 2010.

== See also ==
- List of banks in Ukraine
