= Friedrich Mering =

Physician in Russian Empire

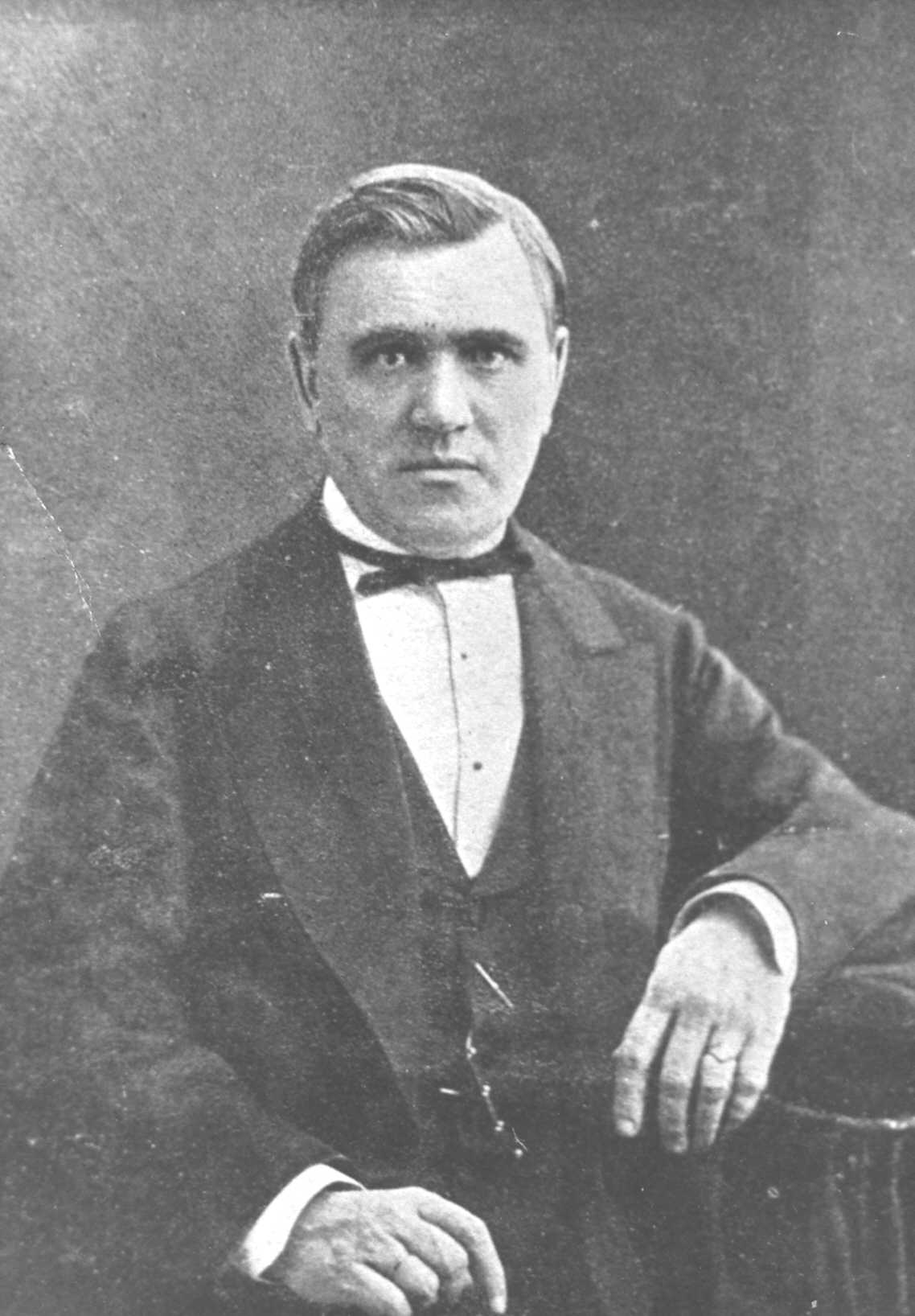
- Born: Dohna, Kingdom of Saxony
- Died: Kiev, Russian Empire
- Citizenship: Russian Empire
- Awards: Order of Saint Vladimir 2nd, 3d, and 4th class, Order of Saint Anna 1st and 2nd class, Order of Saint Stanislaus 1st and 2nd class

Friedrich Mering (German: Friedrich Georg Mering, Russian: Фёдор Фёдорович Меринг, Фридрих Фридрихович Меринг, romanized: Fyodor Fyodorovich Mering, Friedrich Friedrichovich Mering) (26 February [10 March] 1822 — 19 [31] October 1887) was one of the most popular Kyiv medical doctors, a professor emeritus of Kyiv university, and an owner of a large Mering estate in downtown Kyiv.

== Life ==
Mehring was born in Dohna (then in Kingdom of Saxony) into a family of doctors. In 1840 he graduated from high school in Dresden, after which he entered the Dresden Medical Academy. From 1841 he studied at the University of Leipzig, graduating in 1845 and receiving the title of Doctor of Medicine and Surgery, as well as a diploma of obstetrician. At the end of the same year he left for the Russian Empire, where he was invited to the estate of the daughter of Count Mikhail Speransky, Buromka in Poltava Governorate, to head the 50-bed hospital founded by the Count. Before taking up the post, he confirmed his qualifications through tests at the Saint Vladimir Imperial University of Kiev. After working at the hospital for about two years, he went into private practice. In 1849–1851 he served in a hospital in St. Petersburg. Then he passed the exam for the Russian title of Doctor of Medicine at the Imperial University of Dorpat (now Tartu) and, at the suggestion of Nikolay Pirogov, he took part in the competition to fill a professorial chair at Kiev University. Mering accepted Russian citizenship. In 1855 he headed the hospital therapy clinic at Kiev University, and in 1857 he was appointed professor of special pathology and therapy there. In 1856, alongside his university colleague Sergei Alferyev, he battled a typhus epidemic in the army. From 1865 he was the head of the faculty therapeutic clinic. Mering obtained a rank of Privy Councillor in 1881. He was a distinguished professor since 1878, an Honorary Member of the university since 1887.

Mering had many well-to-do patients in Kiev. He was also exceptionally successful in the real estate deals, to the point of some contemporaries calling him "a shrewd businessman disguised as a professor." Others explained his commercial success as a side effect of his philanthropy and compassion:

... He made his fortune not so much through the fees for his treatments and consultations, but in another way: he treated Jewish poor for free; never accepting money from them and never refusing to help, and the seriously ill treated them in their poor homes. As a result, Mering acquired enormous popularity among the Jewish lower classes, and in order to thank him, the Jews suggested him various deals, the purchase of various houses, estates, etc., which, in their opinion, were expected to appreciate. And so Mering, guided by the advice of these Jews, of whom he knew many thanks to his extensive free practice, constantly bought and sold various estates, and real estate in general. And in fact, he made his fortune precisely through these operations.

— Sergei Witte

Mehring died after a long illness (with elephantiasis syndrome) on October 19 (31), 1887. Multiple thousands joined funeral procession, including a Lutheran pastor, an Orthodox priest and a Jewish rabbi that participated on behalf of their flock. Mering was buried in the Askold's Grave cemetery, the tombstone did not survive.

== Works ==
- Report on the typhus epidemic during the Crimean War (jointly with S. P. Alferyev). Published in the Military Medical Journal (St. Petersburg) in 1856, 1857, 1859.
- Lectures on hygiene. Published in Modern Medicine (Kiev) in 1863–1865.

== Awards ==
Friedrich Mehring was awarded multiple orders of the Order of Saint Vladimir (up to 2nd class, Order of Saint Anna (up to 1st class), Order of Saint Stanislaus (up to 1st class). He was also awarded a medal in memory of the Crimean War.

== Estate ==
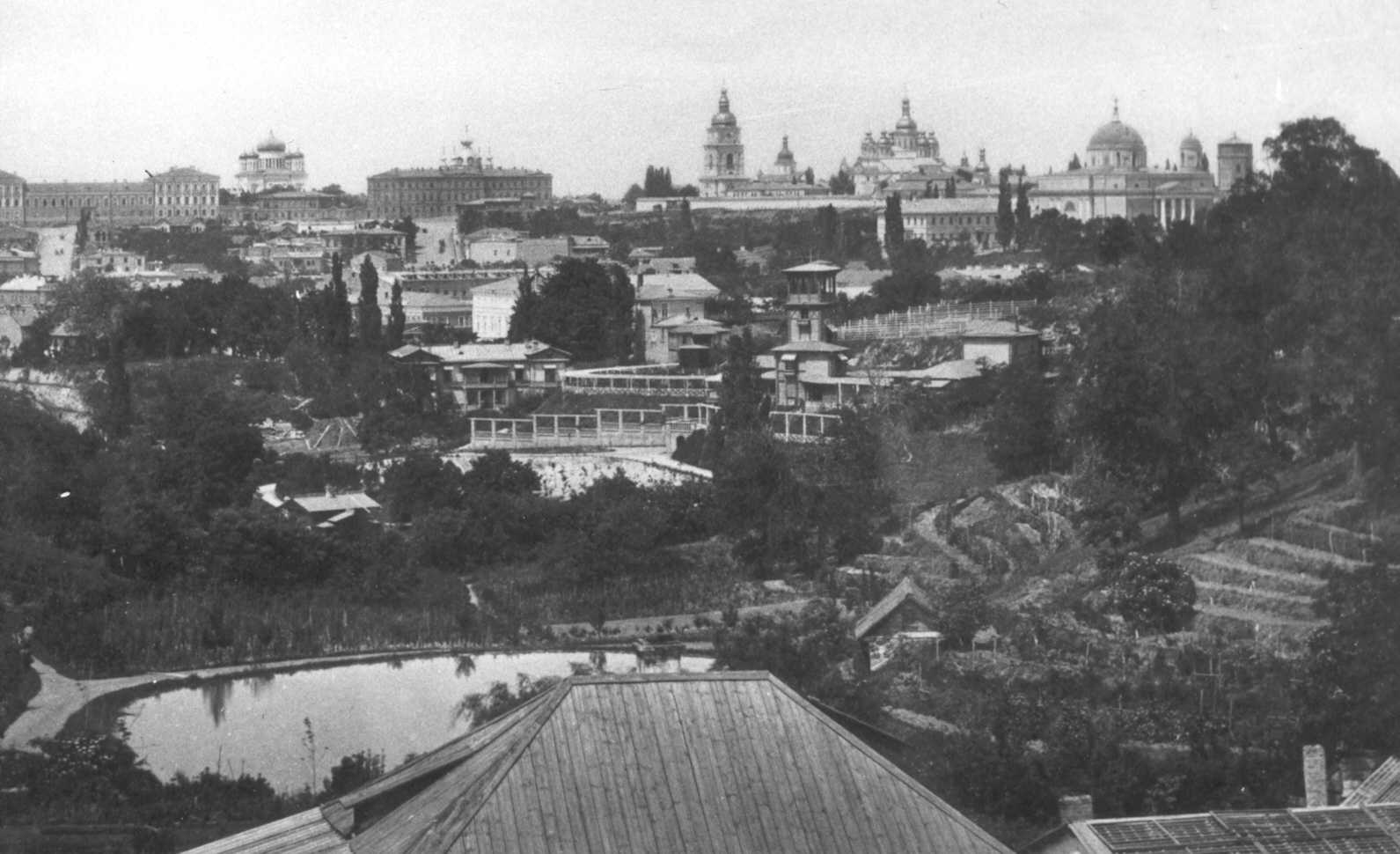
Mering estate (in the foreground, 1870s)

Through the real estate deals Mering acquired a vast estate in the very center of Kiev. It occupied an area of over 10.5 hectares bounded by Khreshchatyk, Instytutska Street, Bankova Street, and Lyuteranska Street. The estate included few apartment buildings near Khreshchatyk, but the main part of the palatial estate included grounds with a pond, bathing area, garden, vegetable garden, etc. "Mehring's Garden" was well known to Kiev residents; a public skating rink opened on the pond in cold winters.

After Friedrich Mehring's death, his heirs decided to sell the estate for development. It was sold for 1.8 million rubles to the Kiev House-Building Joint-Stock Company (House-Building Society), established in 1895. The professor's son Mikhail Mehring became the chairman of the board of the company, and the architect George Schleifer became the managing director. The latter prepared a project for a new layout of the estate, with four streets and a square being built on it, and numerous plots of land being sold for new income-generating construction. The pond was filled in, and the garden was chopped down. In the second half of the 1890s, active development of the Mering estate was carried out creating new streets Nikolaevskaya (now Architect Gorodetsky Street), Meringovskaya (Zankovetskaya), Olginskaya, Novaya (Stanislavsky), and the Nikolaevskaya Square (Ivan Franko). As a result of the 1900—1903 economic crisis and the speculations with assets by Mikhail Mering, the House-Building Society went bankrupt and was dissolved.

== Family ==
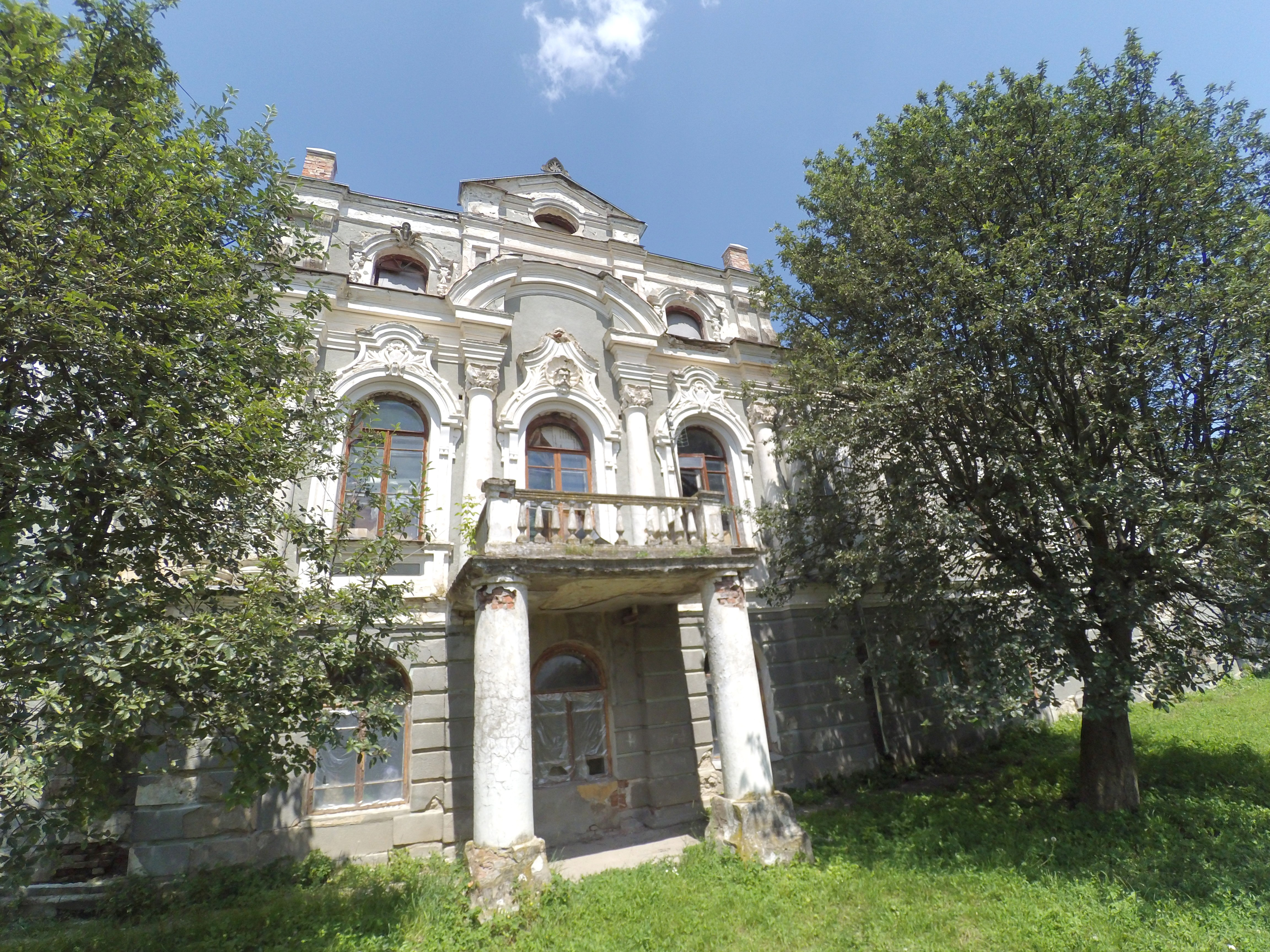
Palace of F.F. Mering's in the village of Staraya Priluka

Friedrich Mehring had three sons and two daughters.

- One of the sons, Mikhail Fyodorovich Mehring, graduated from Kiev University where he studied astronomy, went on to become the director of a private bank, but after his father's death he became interested in risky commercial projects and lost his fortune.
- Another son, Sergei Mering (1862–1920), was an entrepreneur, sugar manufacturer; in 1918, he was the Minister of Trade and Industry of the Ukrainian State. He owned an estate and a palace in the village of Staraya Priluka (the palace had survived, and now houses a boarding school). Several paintings from the palace collection were transferred to the local history museum of the city of Vinnytsia in 1956 (now in the Vinnytsia Regional Art Museum); among them is a portrait of Friedrich Mehring by Nikolai Ge.

== Sources ==
- "Меринг, Фридрих Фридрихович" [Friedrich Mering]. Brockhaus and Efron Encyclopedic Dictionary: In 86 Volumes (82 Volumes and 4 Additional Volumes) (in Russian). St. Petersburg: F. A. Brockhaus. 1890–1907.
- Witte, Sergei (2015-10-29). "Служба в Киеве" [Service in Kiev]. Воспоминания [Memoirs] (in Russian). Directmedia. pp. 159–161. ISBN 978-5-4475-0458-8.
- Иконников В. С. Биографический словарь профессоров и преподавателей Императорского Университета Св. Владимира (1834–1884). — Киев, 1884. — С. 404–407.
- Некролог Ф. Ф. Меринга // Киевлянин. — 1887. — 20 октября.
- Макаренко И. М., Полякова И. М. Биографический словарь заведующих кафедрами и профессоров Киевского медицинского института (1841–1991). — Киев: Здоров’я, 1991. — С. 72, 73.
- Hirsch, A.; Gurlt, E.J.; Haberling, W. (1886). "Mering, Friedrich". Biographisches Lexikon der hervorragenden Ärzte aller Zeiten und Völker: Lindsley - Revillon. 4 (in German). p. 211.
