= Lypky =

Neighborhood of Kyiv, Ukraine

Coordinates: 50°26′40″N 30°32′04″E

Lypky (Ukrainian: Липки) is an historic neighborhood of the Ukrainian capital Kyiv located in the administrative Pecherskyi District. The name is derived from a lime tree (Lypa). Lypky is the de facto government quarter of Ukraine, hosting the buildings of the Verkhovna Rada (Parliament), Presidential Administration and Government, as well as ceremonial residences and hotels traditionally used by politicians.

== History ==
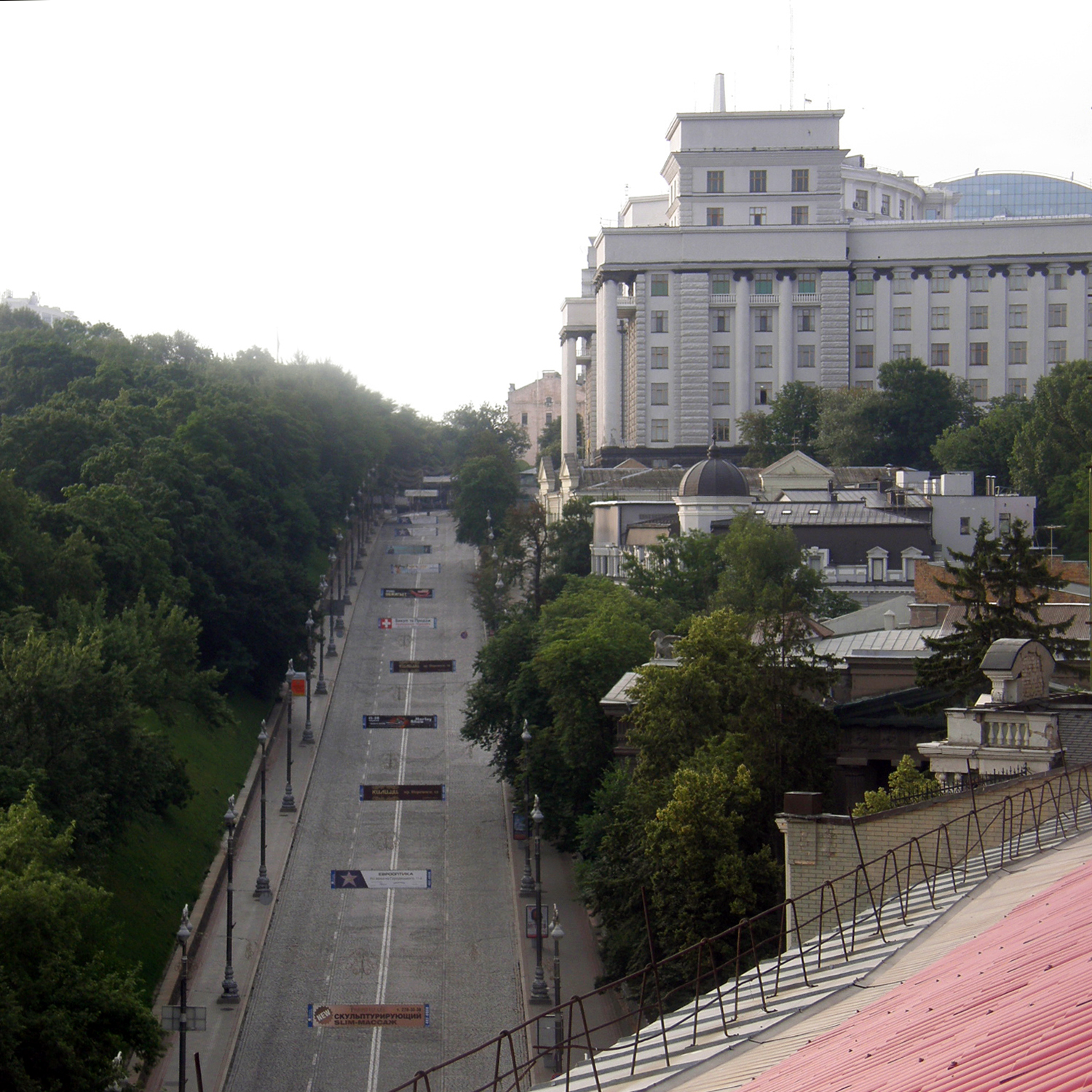
Hrushevsky Street, Lypky's central street viewed uphill, with the Government Building seen on right background

A relatively new district, Lypky emerged in the 19th century and has since become known as an elite area. The neighbourhood is located in the northeastern part of Kyiv Hills between Old Kyiv (bordering it along Khreshchatyk) and the Pechersk neighborhood across the Klovskyi Descent and Mechnykova Street.

The area of Lypky was settled following the construction of the new Pechersk Fortress during the 1830s in order to accommodate inhabitants resettled as a result of the expansion of fortifications. As a result of urban growth, the neighbourhood soon merged with the Old Town and Pechersk. The area was built up according to a regular plan, in contrast to surrounding historical districts.

After the capture of Kyiv by the Bolsheviks on 7 February 1919, Cheka secret police established its headquarters in Lypky, and in the following months several thousand people were exterminated there. During the era of Soviet rule Lypky became the seat of the Verkhovna Rada and Council of Ministers of the Ukrainian SSR.

The streets of Lypky were the scenes of the bloodiest episodes of the Euromaidan revolution (2013–2014).

== Streets and squares ==
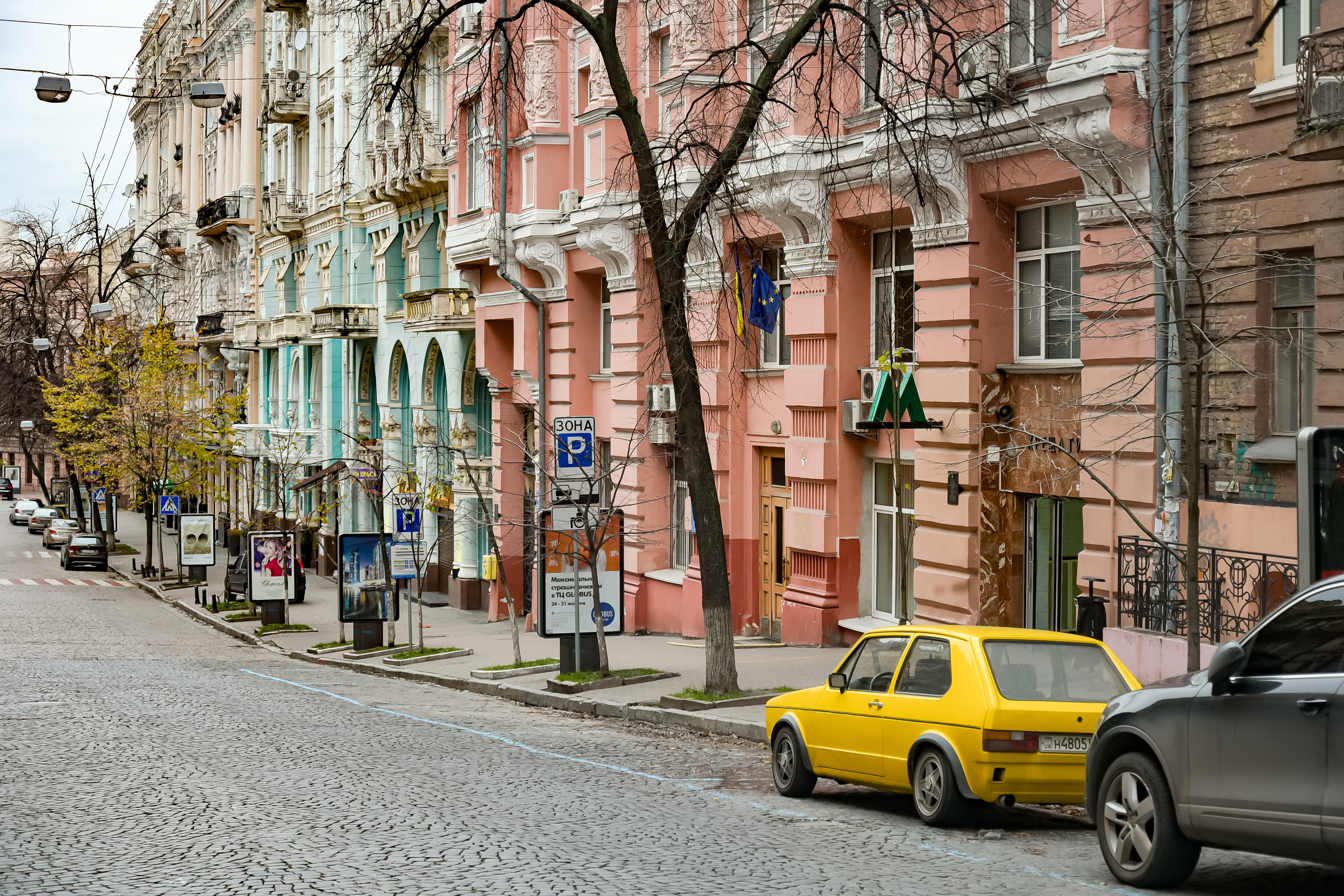
Entrance of Khreshchatyk metro station in Horodetskoho Street, Lypky

Lypky proper

- Akademika Bohomoltsia Street
- Bankova Street
- Hrushevsky Street
- Lypsky Lane (Липський провулок)
- Lypska Street, gave its name to the entire neighbourhood
- Pylyp Orlyk Street
- Sadova Street
- Shovkovychna Street

Sadyba Merinha (Mering Estate)

This area overlaps with the Uryadovy Kvartal (Government Quarter).

- Alley of Heroes of the Heavenly Hundred
- Architect Horodetsky Street
- Bessarabska Square
- Bohdan Stupka Street
- Bridge over Instytutska Street
- Darwin Street
- Instytutska Street
- Ivan Franko Square
- Kruhlo University Street
- Krutyi Descent
- Kyiv Passage, between Khreshchatyk and Zankovetska Street
- Liuteranska Street
- Olhynska Street
- Zankovetska Street

Mariinsky Park and City Park

- Alley of Magdeburg rights
- Constitution Square

== Notable buildings ==
- Verkhovna Rada building
- Government Building, Kyiv
- National Art Museum of Ukraine
- National Bank of Ukraine building
- Lobanovsky Dynamo Stadium
- Mariinskyi Palace (1755)
- Klov Palace (1758)

== Gallery ==
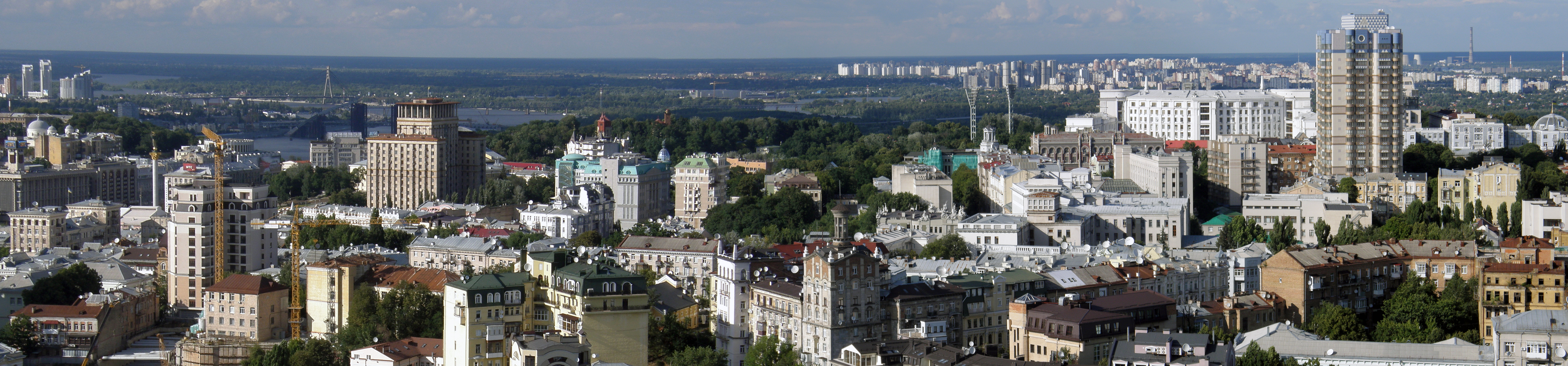
Panorama of Lypky, from Bessarabian Market towards the northeast, July 2013

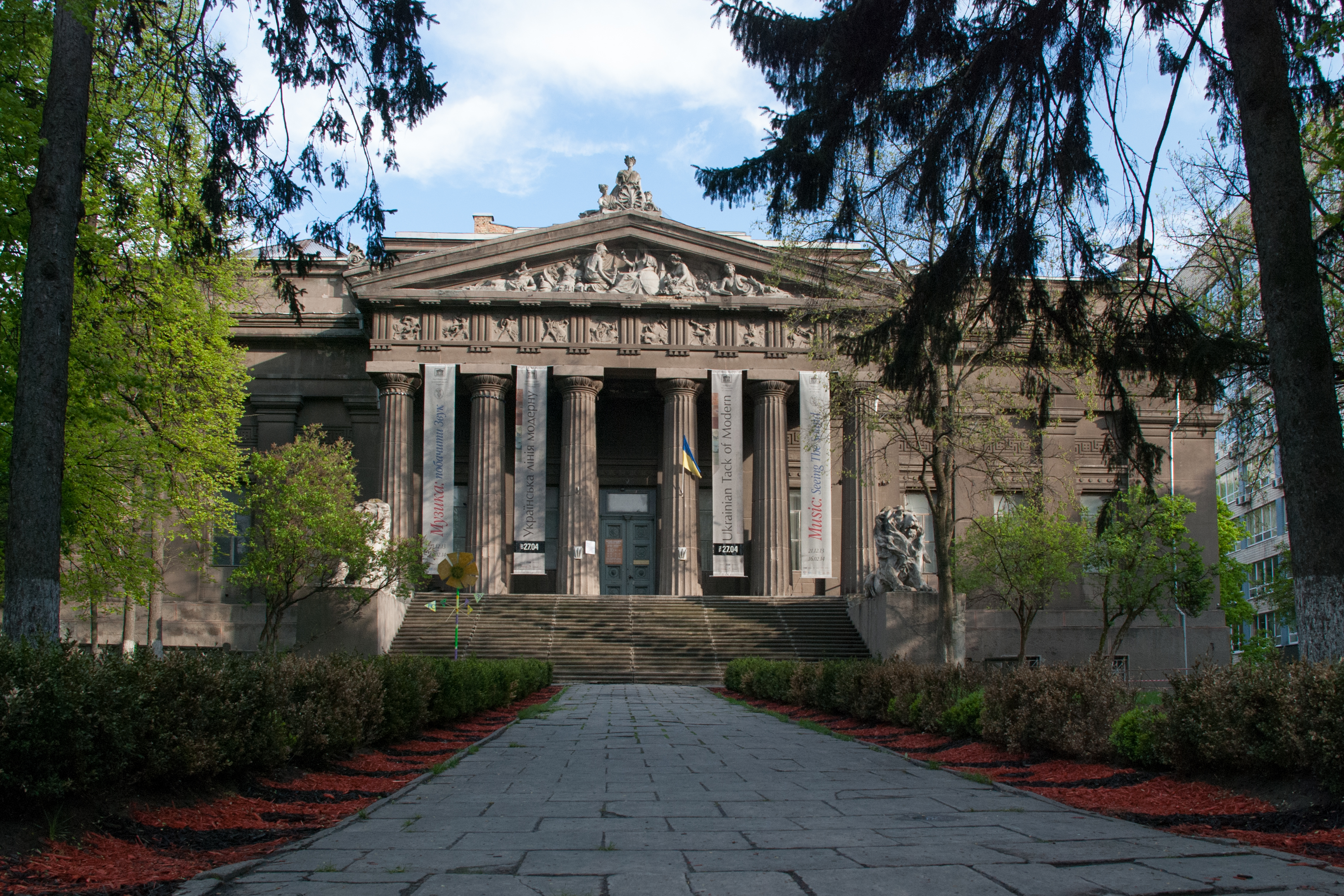
National Art Museum

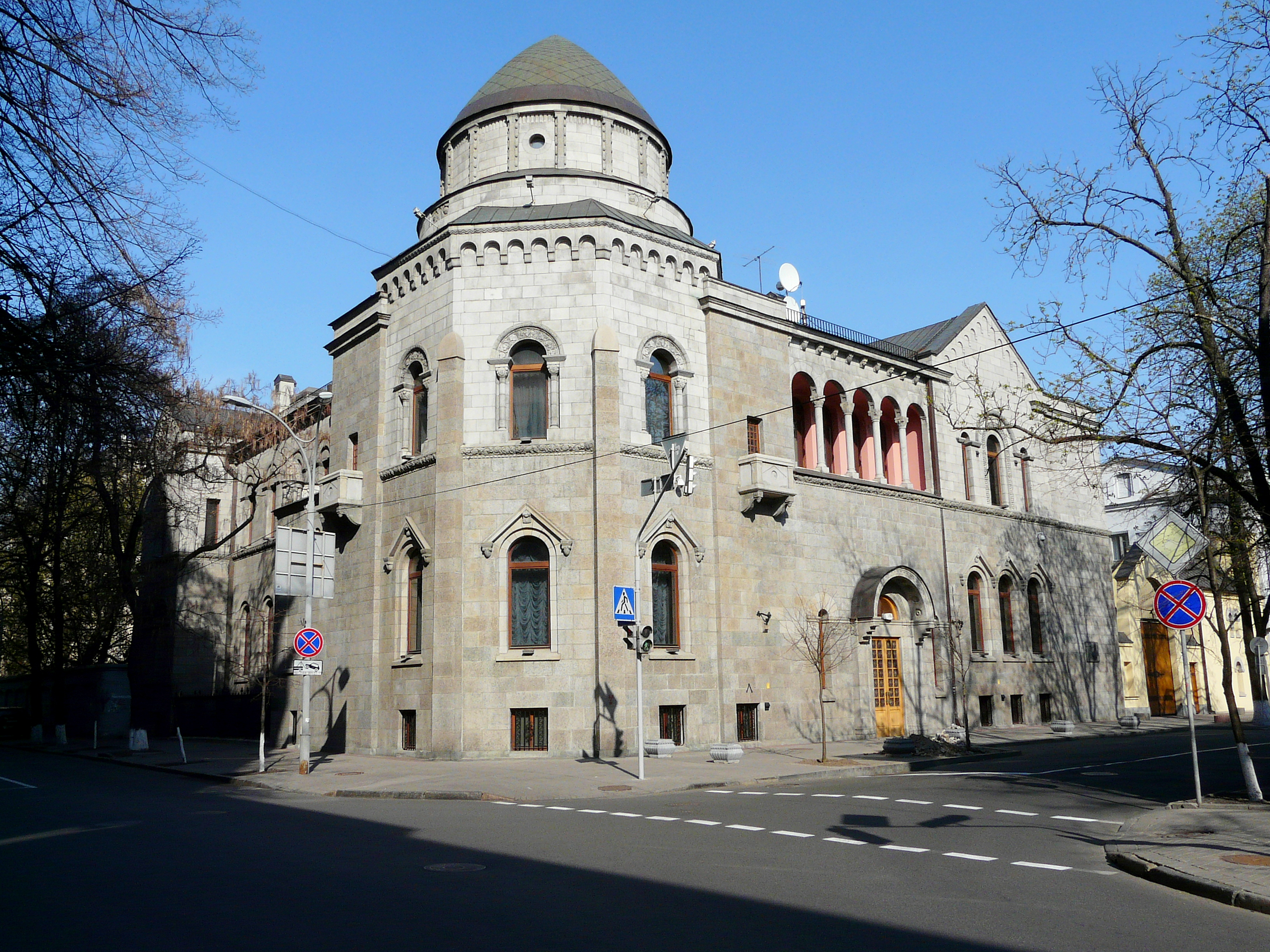
Kovalevsky's house

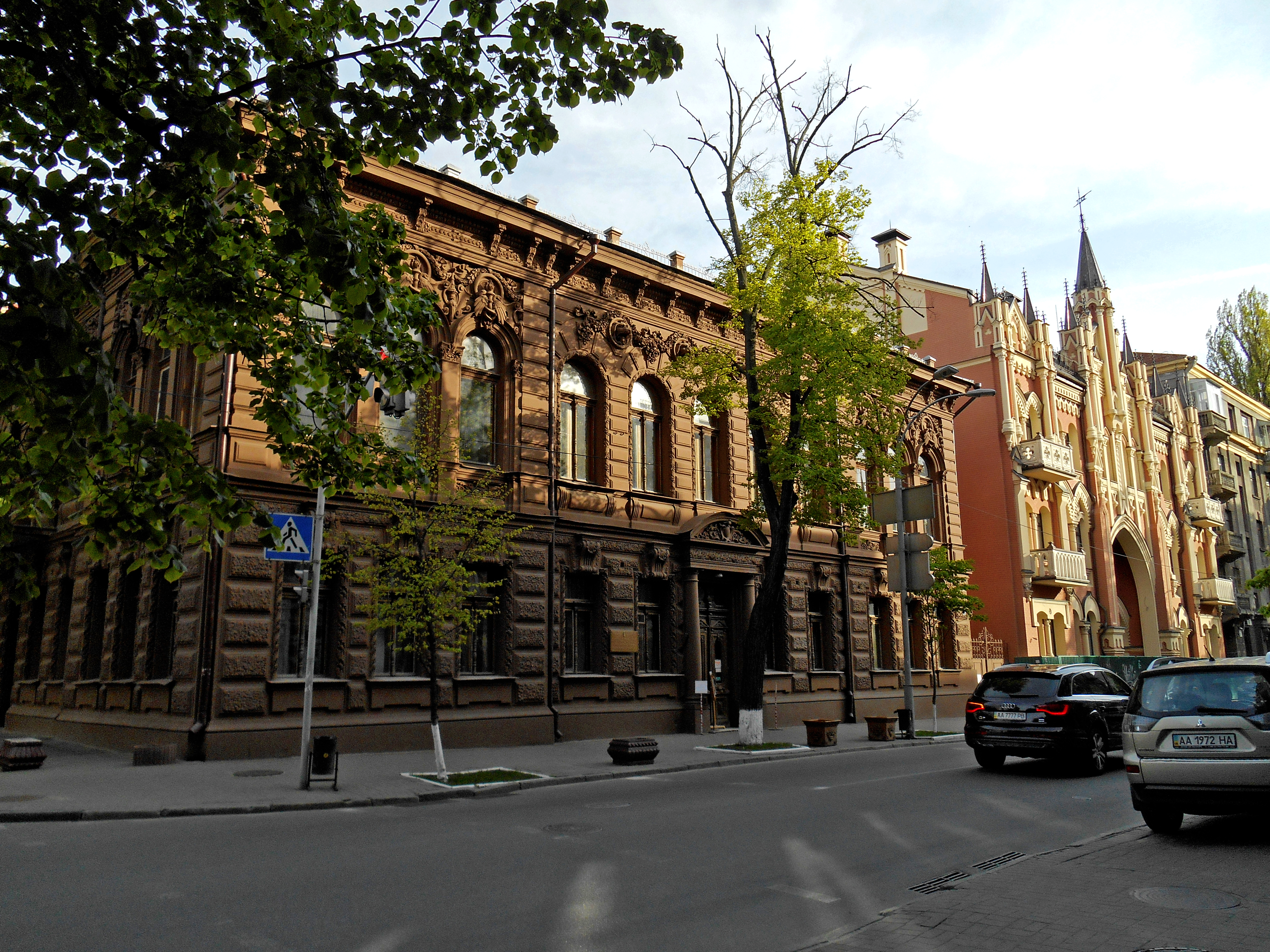
"Chocolate House"

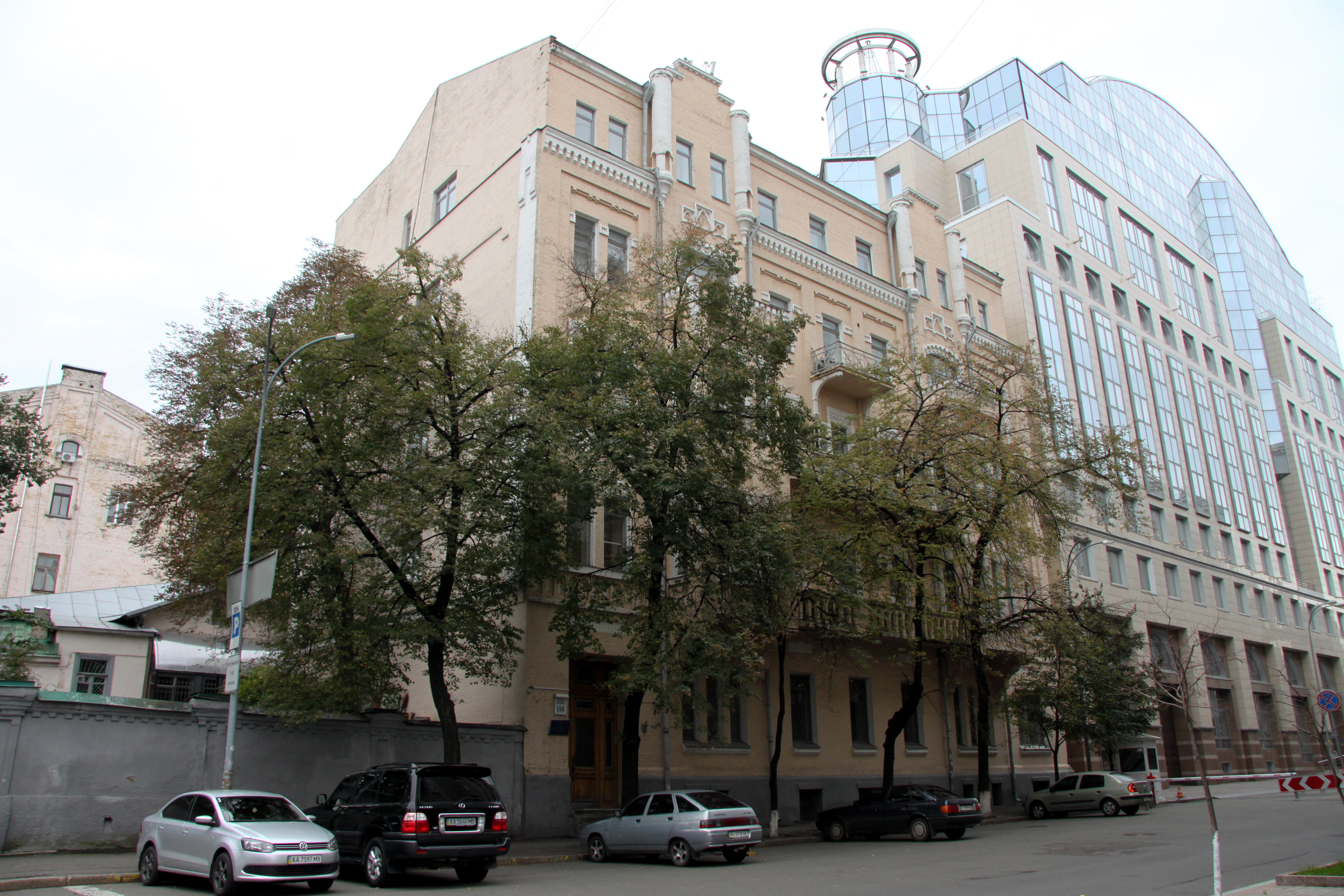
Sadova Street in Lypky neighborhood. Modern office building to the right houses various bodies of the Verkhovna Rada (Ukraine's parliament)
