= October Palace =

Performing arts centre in Kyiv, Ukraine

International Center of Culture and Arts
- October Palace
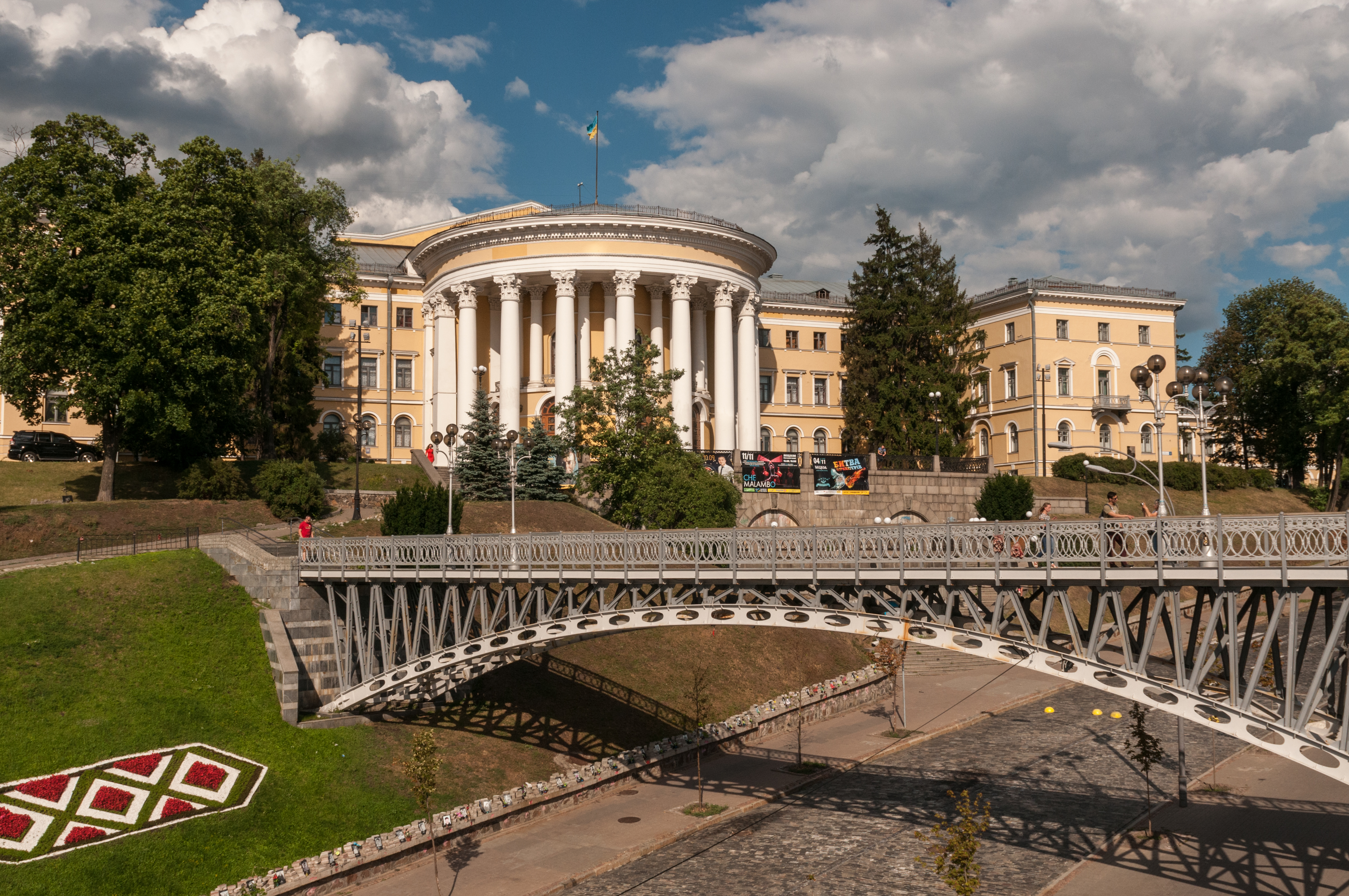
- View on the October Palace from the Alley of Heroes of the Heavenly Hundred, including the Bridge over Instytutska Street (2017)
- Interactive map of International Center of Culture and Arts
- Former names: Kyiv Institute for Noble Maidens
- Address: Alley of Heroes of the Heavenly Hundred, 1 Kyiv; Ukraine
- Coordinates: 50°27′0″N 30°31′41″E
- Owner: Federation of Trade Unions of Ukraine

Construction
- Architect: Vikentiy Beretti

Website
- www.icca.kiev.ua

The October Palace (Ukrainian: Жовтневий палац, romanized: Zhovtnevyi palats, IPA: [ʒou̯tˈnɛwɪj pɐˈlɑts]) is a performing arts center in Kyiv, Ukraine. It is officially known as the International Center of Culture and Arts (Ukrainian: Міжнародний центр культури і мистецтв, romanized: Mizhnarodnyi tsentr kultury i mystetstv) of the Trade Union Federation of Ukraine, while October Palace is used for its brevity.

== History ==
The building was constructed between 1838 and 1842 upon the design of architect Vikentiy Beretti as the Russian "Kyiv Institute for Noble Maidens" (Russian: Институт благородных девиц, romanized: Institut Blagorodnykh Devits), hence the street where it was located was called Instytutska Street. After the revolution, the building was used by the government, including housing for Kyiv's Cheka (later known as the KGB).

Almost completely destroyed in the Second World War, the building was renovated between 1952 and 1959, and named the October Palace of Culture, used primarily as a concert stage. The street was also renamed October Revolution Street. After the fall of the Soviet Union, the building was renamed to its present-day name, and it continues to be used as a concert hall, with a movie theater wing being recently added.

The Center contains a library housing more than 70,000 items, and cultural and political events featuring writers, composers, diplomats, politicians, members of parliament and other public figures are hosted. The building's large foyer is used for hosting exhibitions of both the arts and technology.

The building is also the main training centre for prominent rhythmic gymnastics training center, the Deriugins School.

The Bridge over Instytutska Street, in front of the October Palace, was opened in 2002.

During the 2013–2014 Euromaidan protest in Kyiv, the October Palace was occupied by protesters. According to Deriugins School pupil Ganna Rizatdinova, after Euromaidan her school discovered that some of their equipment "like a TV set and a kettle, balls and clubs" had disappeared; "it was a strange kind of robbery. We don't know who did it." Effective from 30 January 2015, part of Instytutska Street was renamed Alley of Heroes of the Heavenly Hundred; consequently, the October Palace's address changed to "Алея Героїв Небесної Сотні, 1".

In 2018 the British rock band Bring Me the Horizon recorded their music video for the song "Mantra" here.

== NKVD execution prison ==
During the 1920s and 1930s about 120,000 people were killed in the building (shot down or by other means). Among them - famous Soviet Ukrainian artists, painters, writers, politicians, professors, teachers, scientists, priests and so on, like Hryhorii Kosynka, Mykola Ivasyuk, Maik Yohansen and Mykhail Semenko. The bodies of the victims were secretly taken to the outskirts of Kyiv, to the Bykivnia Forest, and buried.

== Ensembles ==
- National orchestra of folks instruments
- Jazz orchestra "Muzychna laboratoria" (Music laboratory)
- National ensemble of folk dance "Horlytsia"
- National opera studios
- National ensemble of classic ballet "Prosvit"
- Children ensemble of classic ballet "Etyud"
- Children ensemble of folk songs "Spivanochka"
