= Instytutska Street =

Street in Pecherskyi District, Kyiv, Ukraine

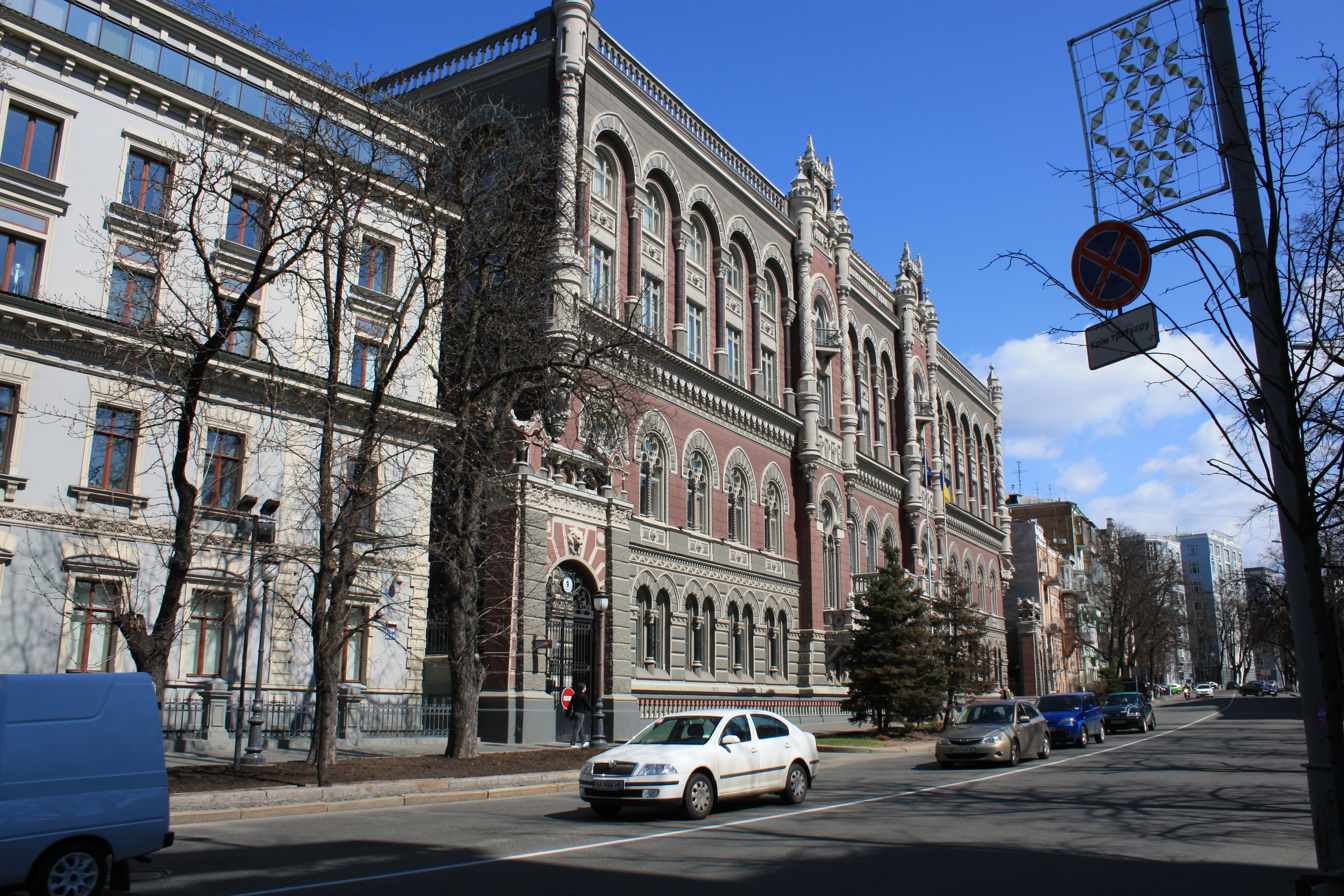
- National Bank of Ukraine Building
- Native name: Інститутська вулиця (Ukrainian)
- Length: 756 m (2,480 ft)
- Location: Lypky, Pecherskyi District; Kyiv, Ukraine
- Postal code: 01001, 01021, 01601
- Nearest metro station: Khreshchatyk; Arsenalna
- Coordinates: 50°26′52.102″N 30°31′45.401″E

Instytutska Street (Ukrainian: Інститутська вулиця, romanized: Instytutsjka vulycja) is a street in the neighborhood of Lypky in the Pecherskyi District of Kyiv. It runs from Olhynska Street and the Alley of Heroes of the Heavenly Hundred to the Klovskyi Descent. It was spanned by the Bridge over Instytutska Street from 2002 until 30 January 2015, when this section of the street under it was split off and renamed the Alley of Heroes of the Heavenly Hundred.

== History ==
Instytutska Street arose at the beginning of the 19th century along the ancient Ivanivsky Way, known since the time of Kievan Rus'. At the beginning of the 19th century, in connection with the development of the area, the street was called Ivanovska. From the 1820s and until 1842, it was called Begichevska Street, after the surname of General Dmitry Begichev, the owner of the estate in this area. In 1842, it was renamed Instytutska Street, the name comes from the Kyiv Institute for Noble Maidens built on the street between 1838 and 1842 (later the October Palace). There was also a parallel unofficial name, Divocha Vulytsia.

In 1919, the street was named 25 Zhovtnia, in honor of the date of the October Revolution of 1917. During the German occupation of the city in 1942-1943 it was called Berlinerstrasse (Ukrainian: Berliner Str, Ukrainian: Берлінська) and Instytutska. In 1944, it was renamed October Revolution Street. The current historical name of the street was restored in 1993.

=== Euromaidan ===
The street became especially famous during the Euromaidan events on 18 to 20 February 2014, when mass shootings of peaceful protesters took place on it. Since that time, the street was sometimes unofficially called Alley of Heroes of the Heavenly Hundred in honour of the casualties. On 23 February 2014, the Verkhovna Rada of Ukraine registered a draft resolution on renaming the street to Heavenly Hundred Street in honor of those killed in the Euromaidan. Memorial signs in honor of the fallen heroes of the Euromaidan appeared along the street. In August 2014, the Kyiv City State Administration launched a public discussion on the renaming of Instytutska Street to Heavenly Hundred Street. On 20 November 2014, deputies of the Kyiv City Council decided to rename a part of the street from Maidan Nezalezhnosti to Olhynska Street to Heavenly Hundred Alley. The part of the street where the most massive murders of demonstrators took place on 20 February 2014 was renamed.
