= Alley of Heroes of the Heavenly Hundred =

Street in Pecherskyi District, Kyiv, Ukraine

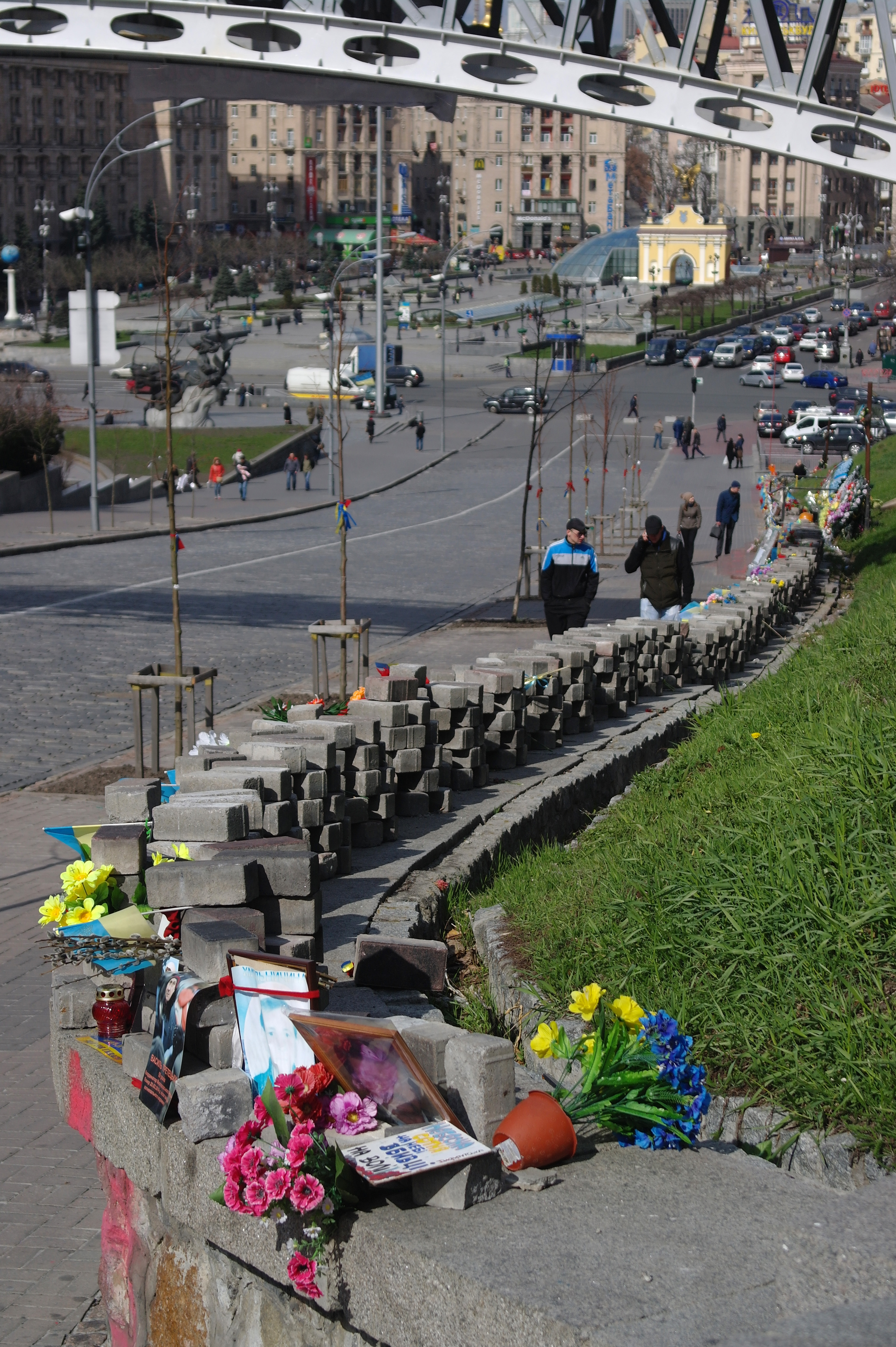
- The Alley with memorials to the Heavenly Hundred, pictured on 7 April 2015 from the southeast, with a view towards the Maidan Nezalezhnosti and the Bridge over Instytutska Street.
- Native name: Алея Героїв Небесної Сотні (Ukrainian)
- Namesake: Heavenly Hundred
- Length: 756 m (2,480 ft)
- Location: Pecherskyi District; Kyiv, Ukraine
- Postal code: 01001
- Coordinates: 50°26′52.1″N 30°31′45.4″E

The Alley of Heroes of the Heavenly Hundred (Note: The official website of the October Palace renders its address in English as "Alley of Heroes of Heavenly Hundred, 1". The official website of Hotel Ukraine renders its address in English as "Heroiiv Nebesnoii Sotni alley, 4".) (Ukrainian: Алея Героїв Небесної Сотні, romanized: Aleya Heroïv Nebesnoï Sotni) is a street in the Pecherskyi District of Kyiv. It runs from Maidan Nezalezhnosti (Independence Square) and the Khreshchatyk to Olhynska and Instytutska Streets. The alley's name is a dedication to the Revolution of Dignity in February 2014.

== Characteristics ==
The alley is pedestrianised. On most of its length, where the shootings took place in February 2014, there are memorials, monuments and plaques to the Heavenly Hundred on both sides. The Bridge over Instytutska Street, opened in 2002, crosses the Alley between the October Palace and Hotel Ukraine.

== History ==
Until 2014 it was part of Instytutska Street, which arose at the beginning of the 19th century along the ancient Ivanivsjkyj Way, (Note: Ukrainian: Іванівського шляху, romanized: Ivanivsjkoho shljakhu. Pre-1918 Russian: Ивановская дорога, romanized: Ivanovskaya doroga.) known since the times of Kyivan Rus'. Later, at various times, it was called Ivanivsjka Street and Behichevsjka Street. Since 1842, it has been called Instytutska Street; the name came from the Kyiv Institute for Noble Maidens, built on the street in 1838–1842 (later the October Palace, now the International Centre of Culture and Arts). There was also a parallel unofficial name: "Maiden Street". (Note: Ukrainian: Дівоча вулиця, romanized: Divocha vulycja.) After the Red Army briefly captured Kyiv on 5 February 1919, on 23 March 1919, the name was changed to "25 October Street", (Note: Ukrainian: вулиця 25 Жовтня, romanized: vulycja 25 Zhovtnja.) the date of the October Revolution. (Note: According to the Old-Style Julian calendar, it began on 25 October 1918. The New-Style Gregorian calendar dates it to 7 November 1918.) During the German occupation of the city in 1942–1943, it was known as "Berlin Street" (Note: German: Berlinerstraße. Ukrainian: Берлінерштрасе, romanized: Berlinershtrase or Ukrainian: Берлінська вулиця, romanized: Berlinsjka vulycja.) or again Instytutska Street. In the year 1944, it was renamed again to "October Revolution Street". (Note: Ukrainian: вулиця Жовтневої революції, romanized: vulycja Zhovtnevoji revoljuciji.) Finally, the name Instytutska Street was restored in 1993.

During the Revolution of Dignity on 20 February 2014, a mass shooting of Euromaidan activists took place on the section of Instytutska Street from Olhynska Street to Maidan Nezalezhnosti and Khreshchatyk. Those who died were subsequently referred to as the Heavenly Hundred, and the street became a place to honour their memory. Almost immediately, proposals began to appear to rename the street in honour of the Heroes of the Heavenly Hundred.

On 20 August 2014, the Kyiv City State Administration initiated a public discussion on renaming "Instytutska Street" to "Heroes of the Heavenly Hundred Street". The discussion ended with the approval of the proposal: 1,614 people (61%) voted in favour, while 1,032 voted against. However, following debates at meetings of the Committee on Culture and Tourism on 6 November and the Kyiv City Council on 20 November 2014, a decision was made to rename only part of Instytutska Street as Alley of the Heroes of the Heavenly Hundred, which was supported by 85 deputies. The decision was published and entered into force on 30 January 2015.

== Commemoration of the Heavenly Hundred on the street ==
After the end of the fighting on 18–20 February 2014, thousands of Ukrainians gathered on this part of Instytutska Street in the following days to honour the memory of the Heroes of the Heavenly Hundred who died here. The street was covered with flowers, and later monuments to the fallen began to appear on the street.

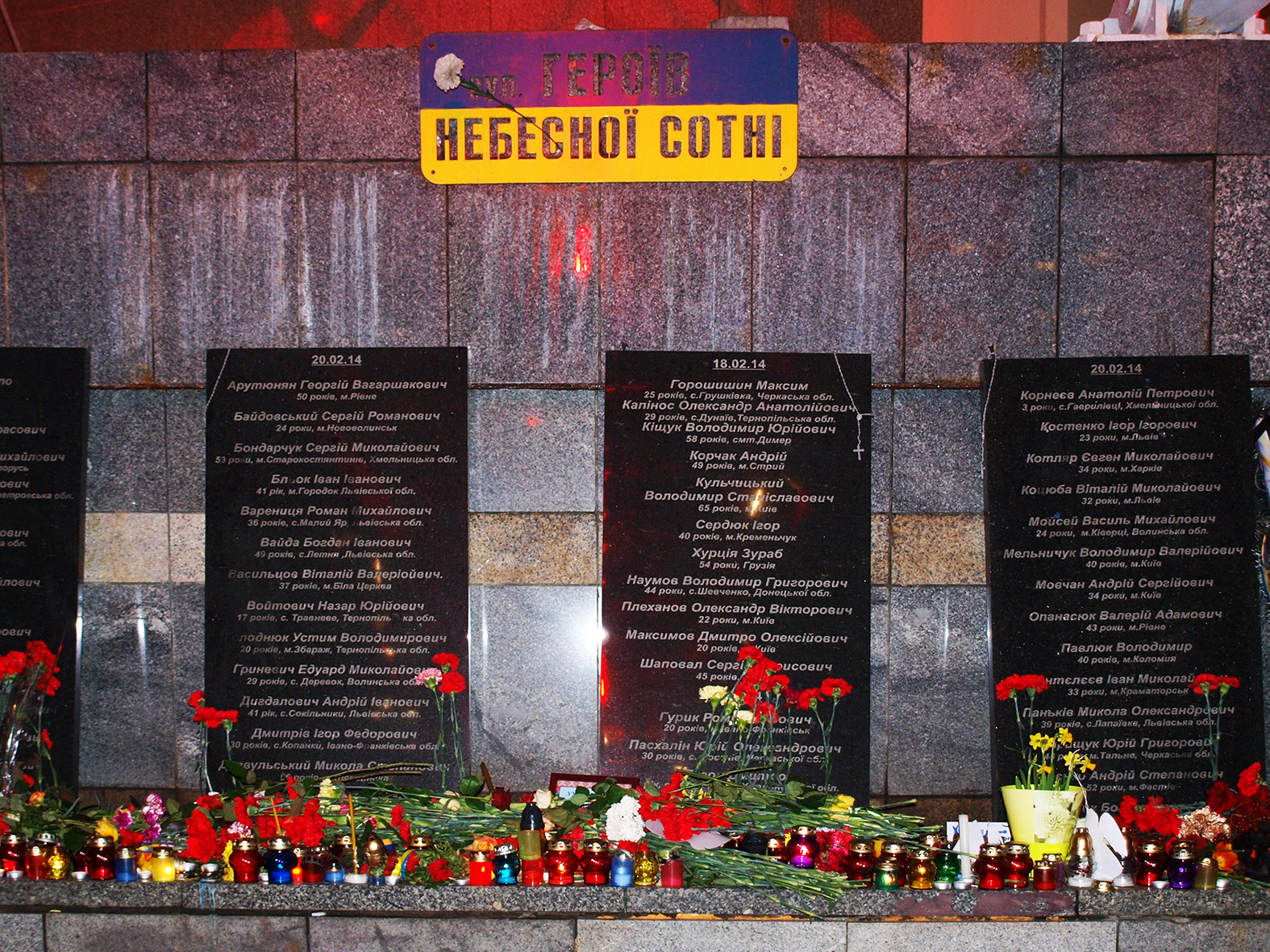
Alley of Heroes of the Heavenly Hundred

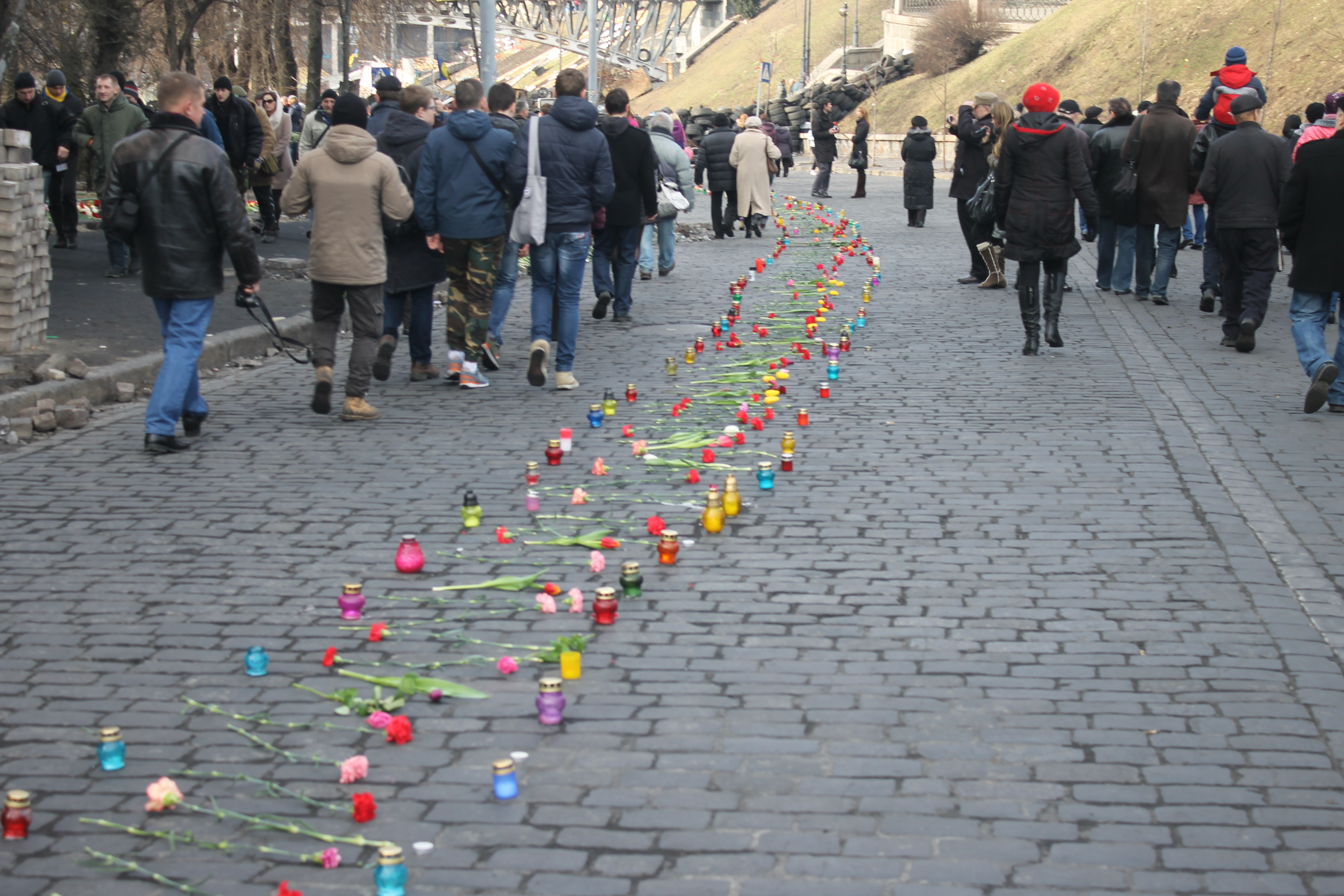
Flowers laid out on Instytutska Street in honour of the fallen of Euromaidan. 24 February 2014

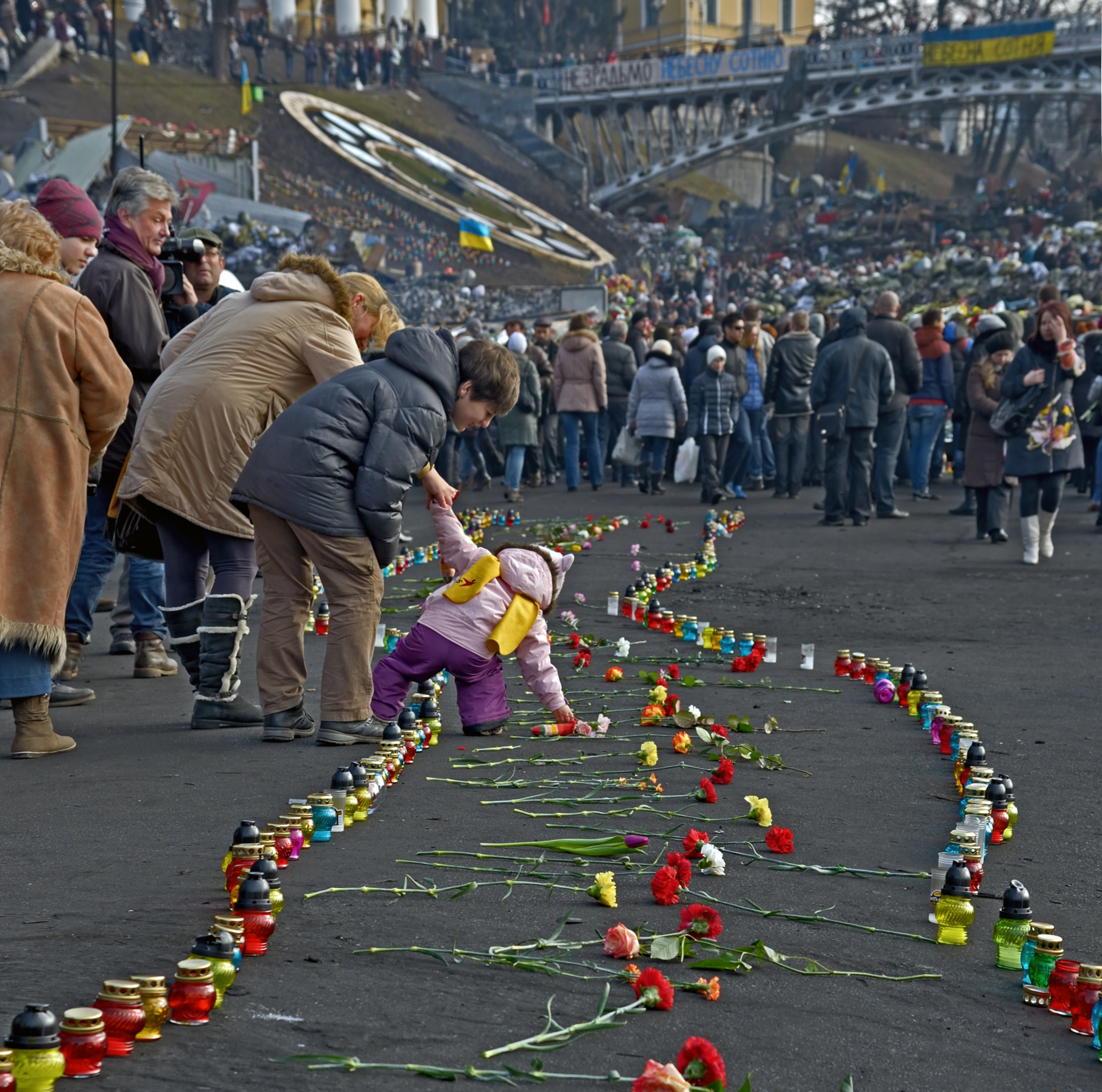
"Road of the Heavenly Hundred", a memorial on the pavement of the alley. 24 February 2014

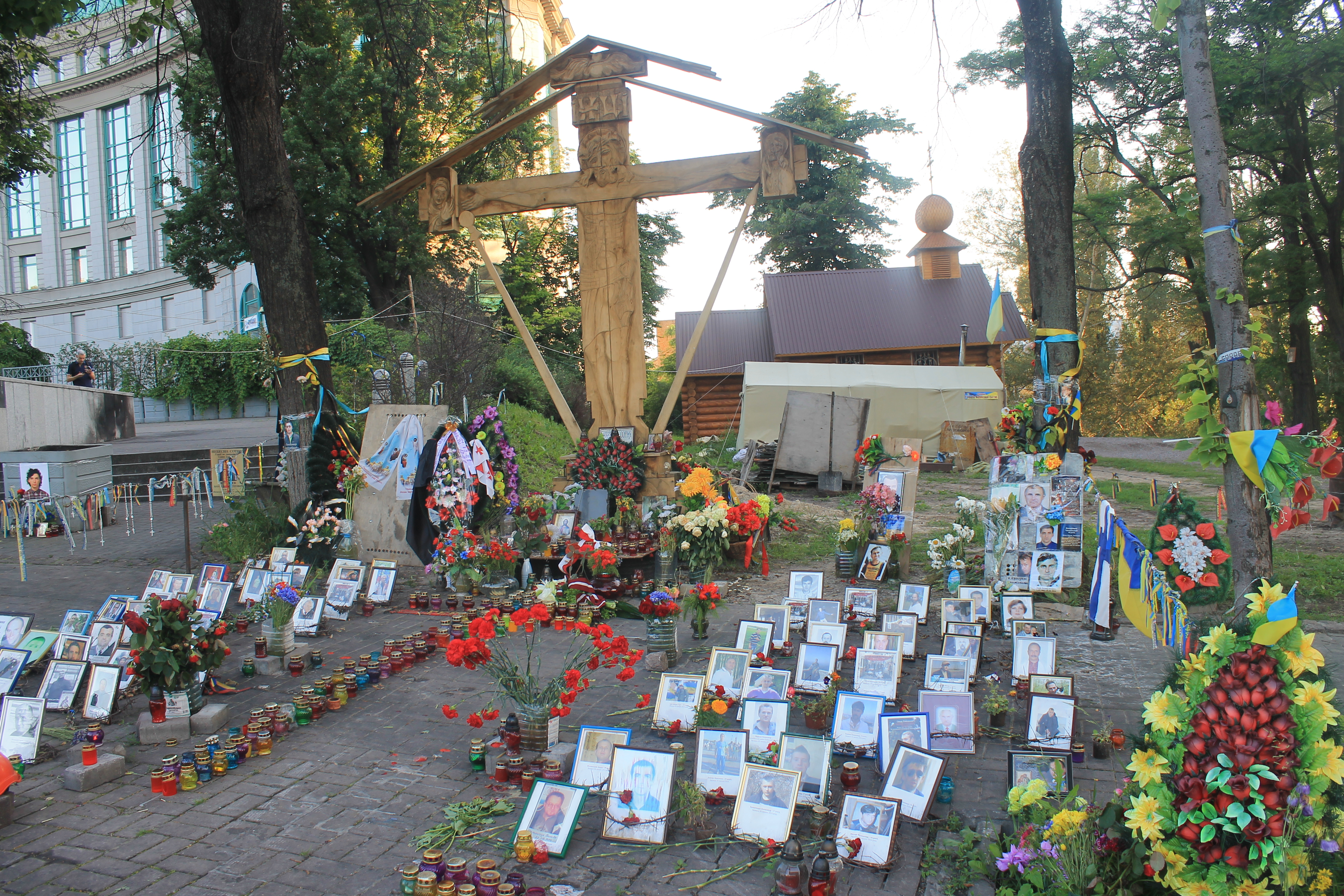
Memorial cross and lamps for the fallen of Euromaidan

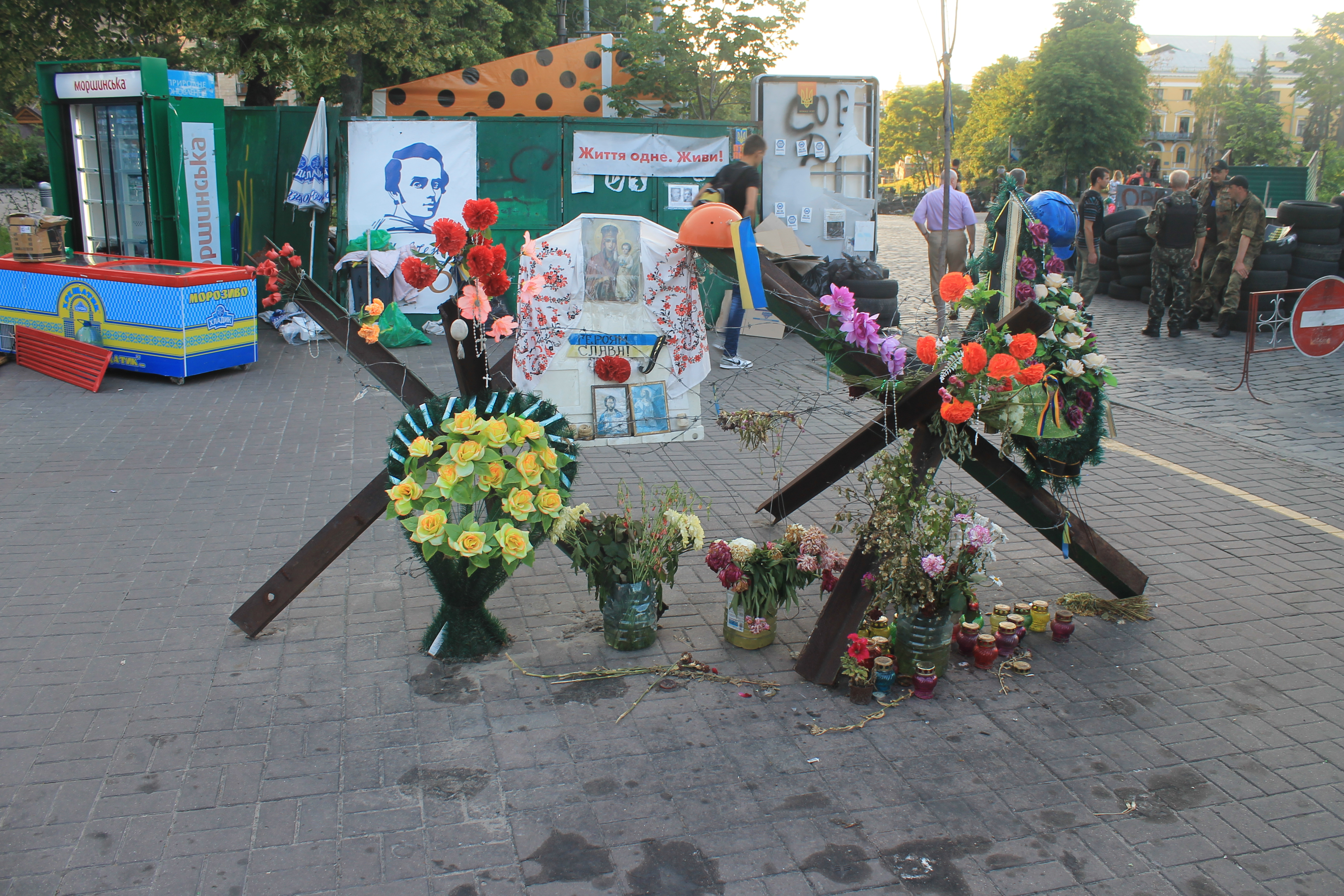
Memorial to those who died near Khreshchatyk metro station's entrance hall

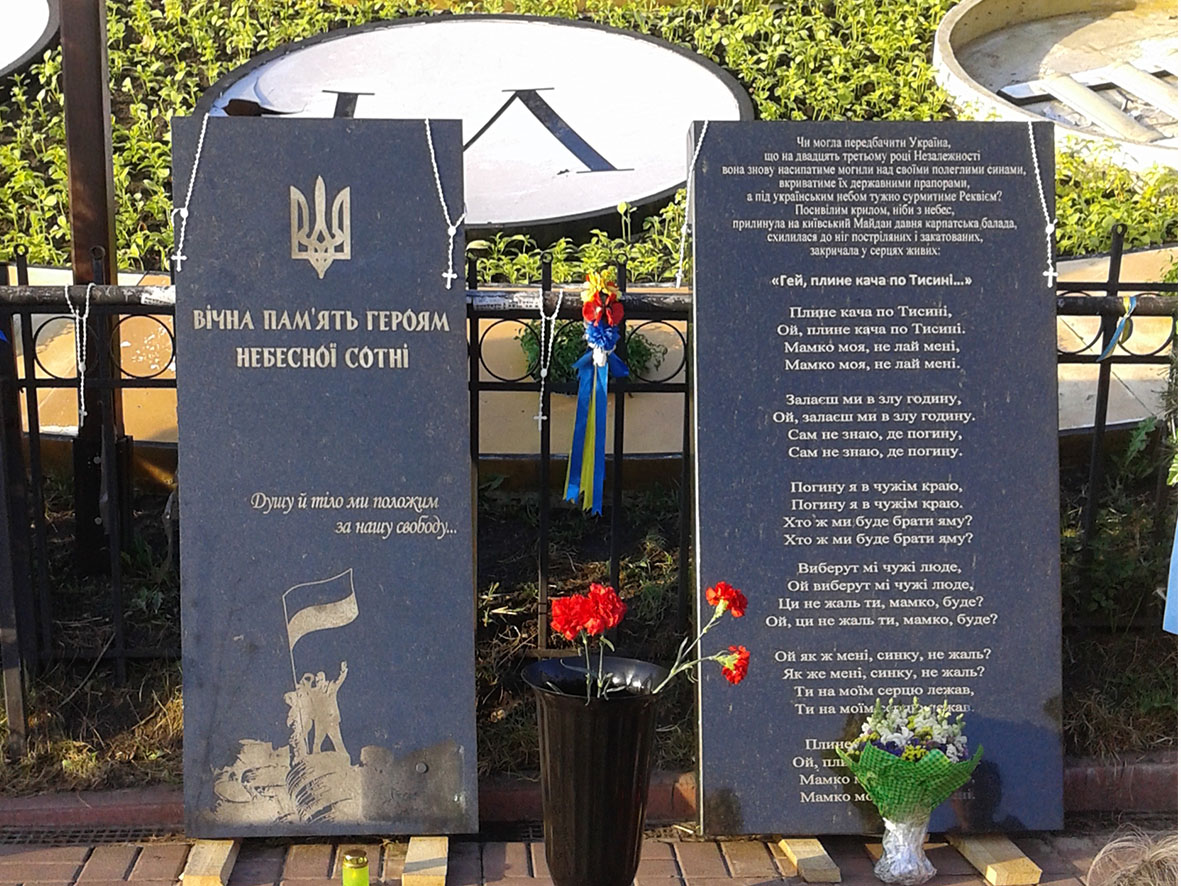
One of many temporary memorials to the Heavenly Hundred

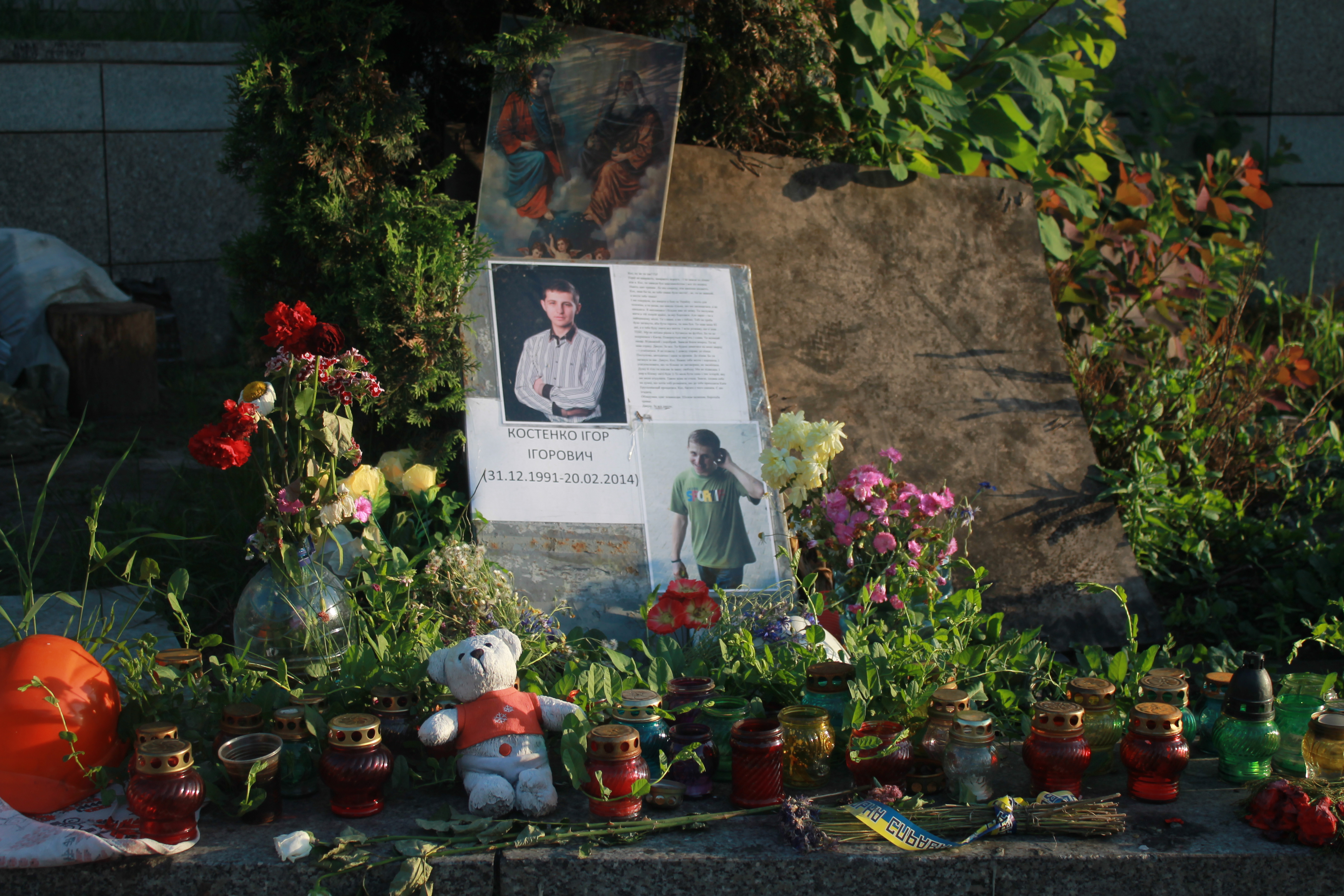
Memorial sign to Ihor Kostenko

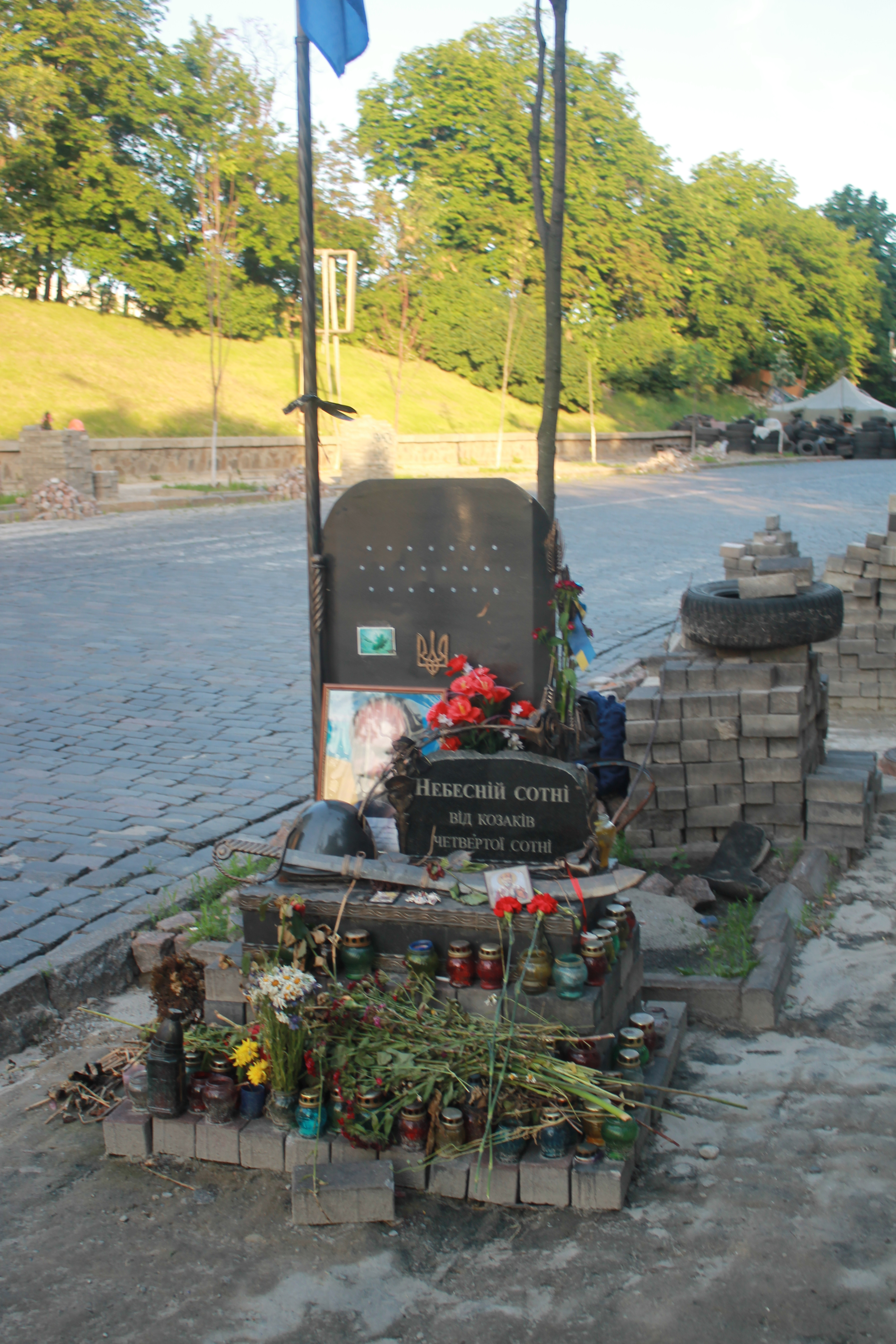
Monument to Maksym Shymko

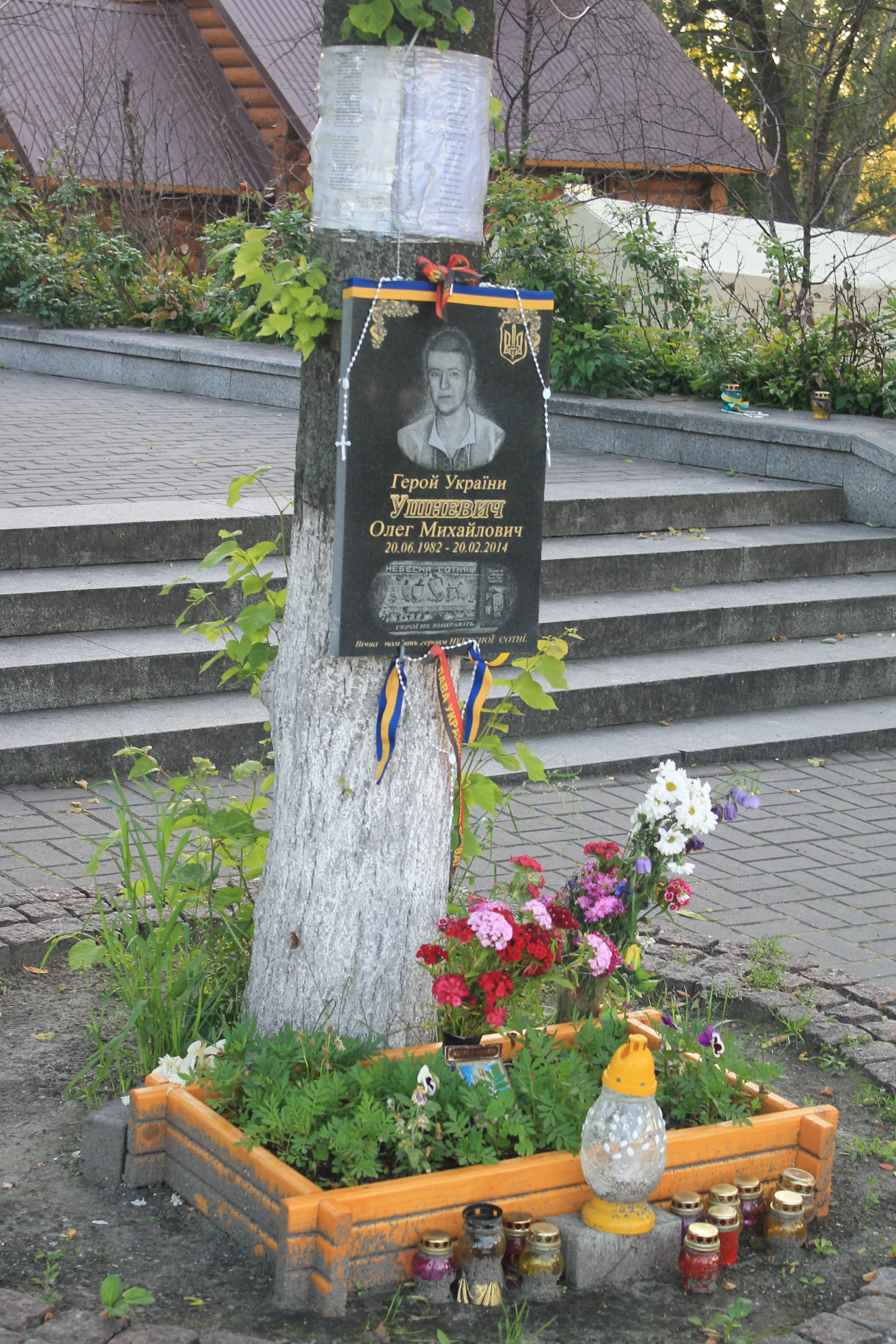
Memorial plaque to Oleh Ushnevych

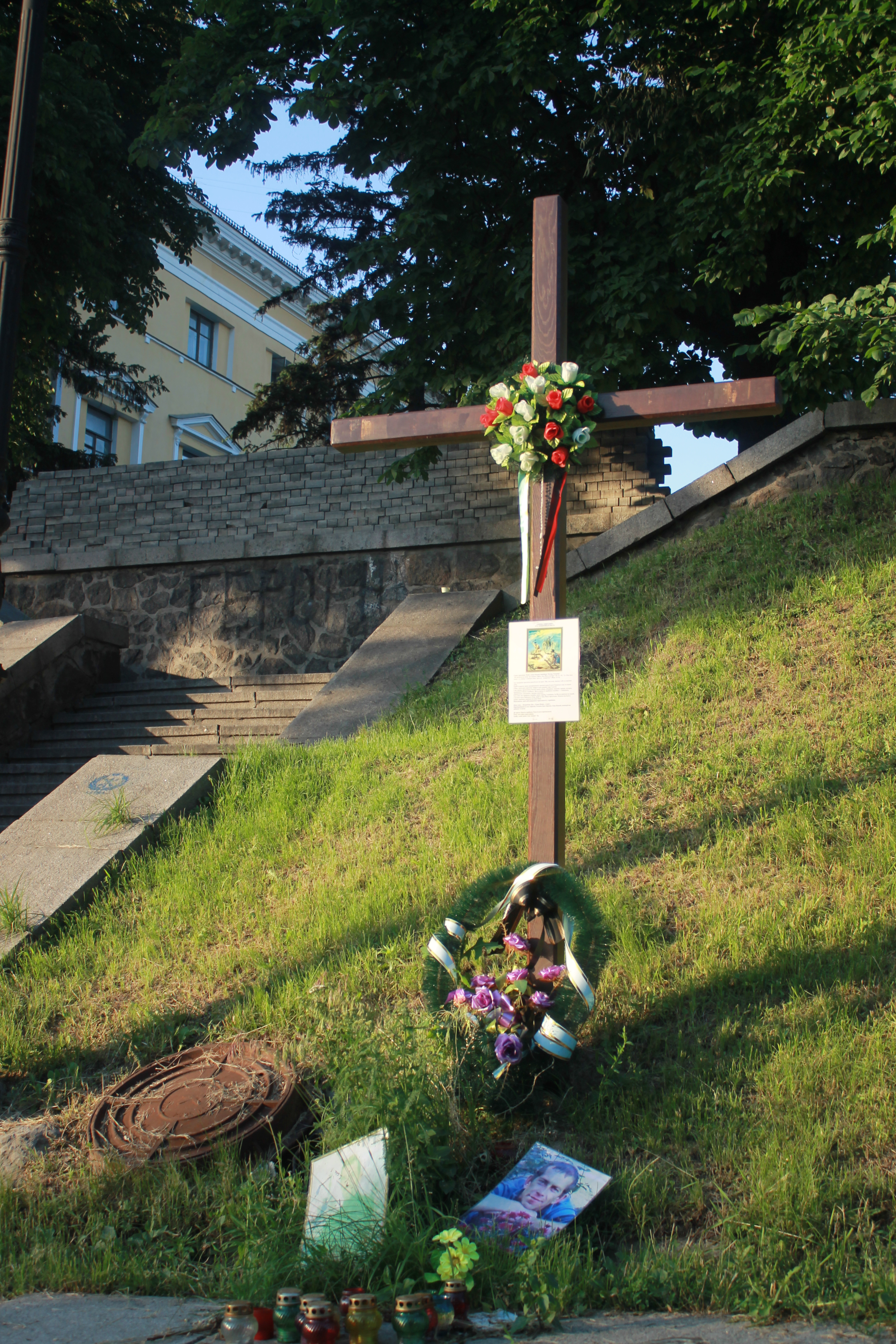
Memorial cross to the fallen of Euromaidan

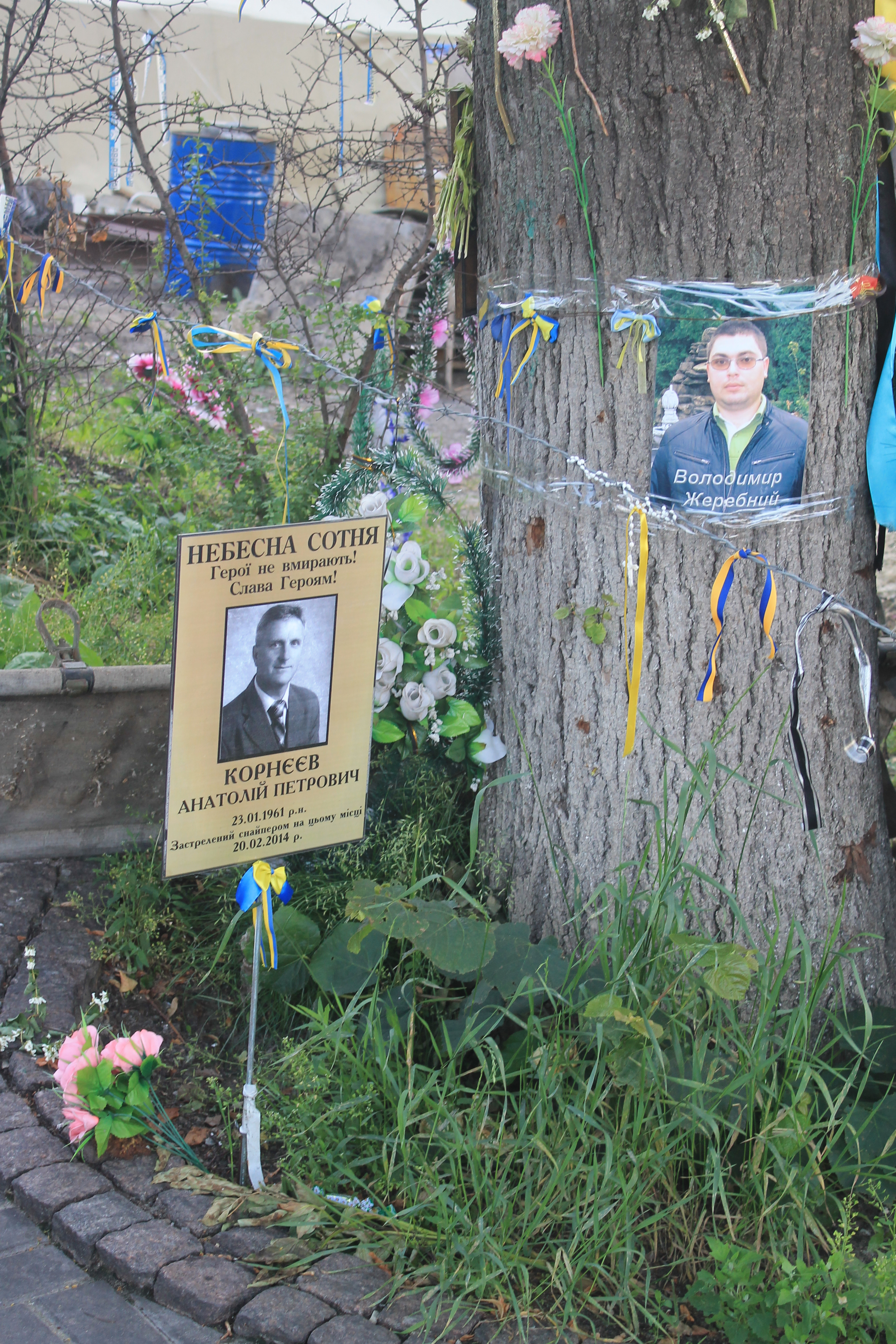
Memorial plaque to Anatoliy Korneyev

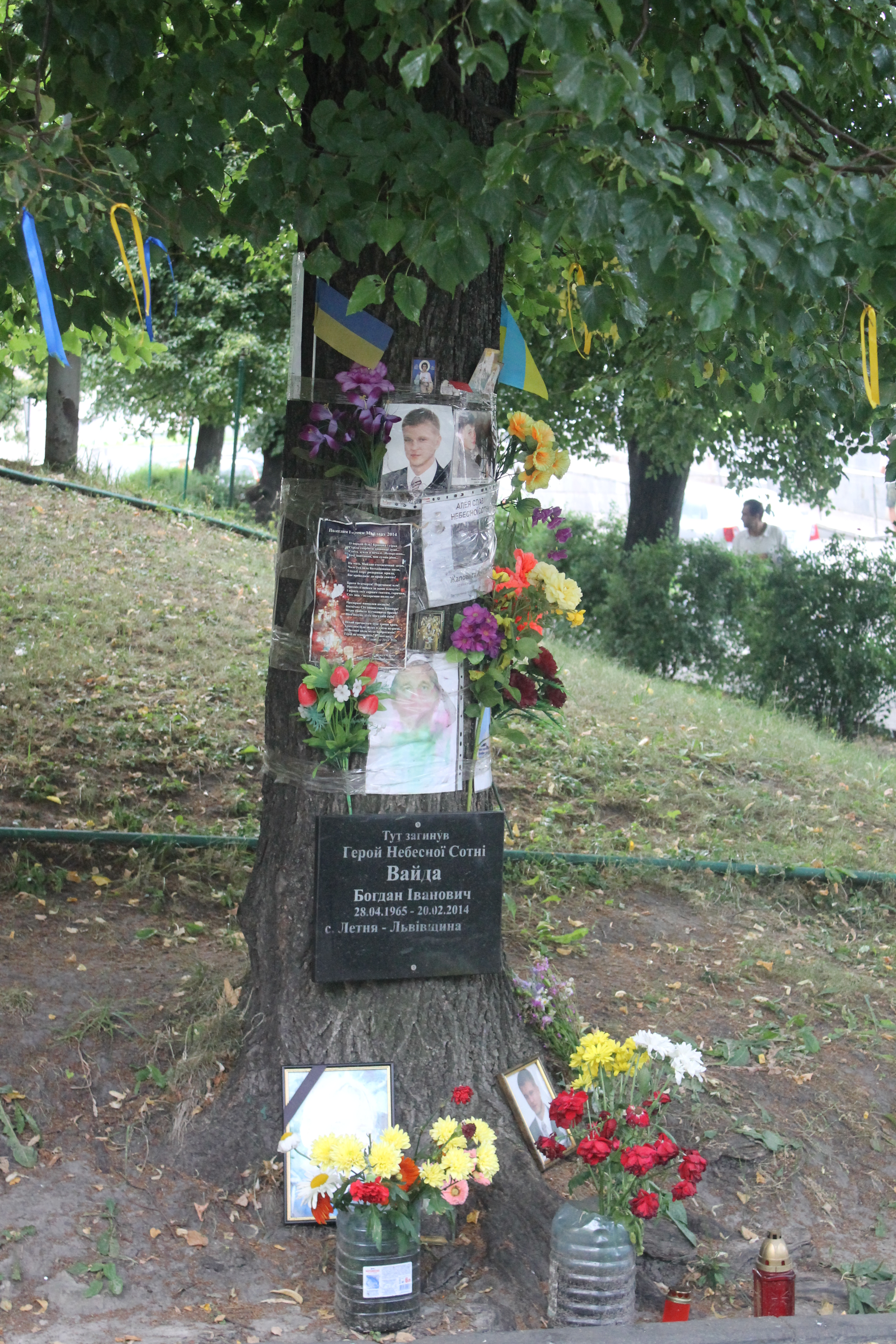
Memorial sign to Bohdan Vaida

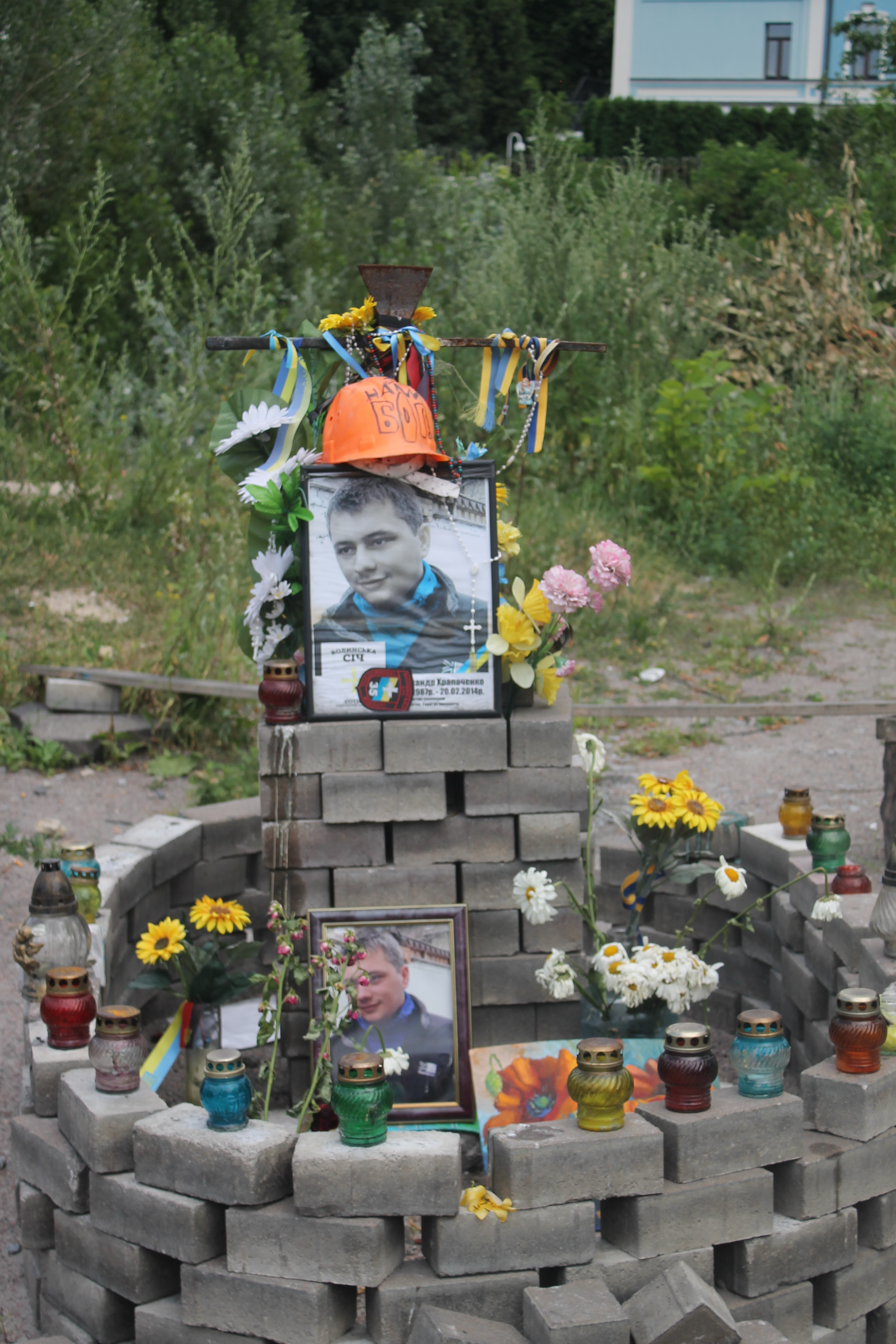
Memorial plaque to Oleksandr Khrapachenko

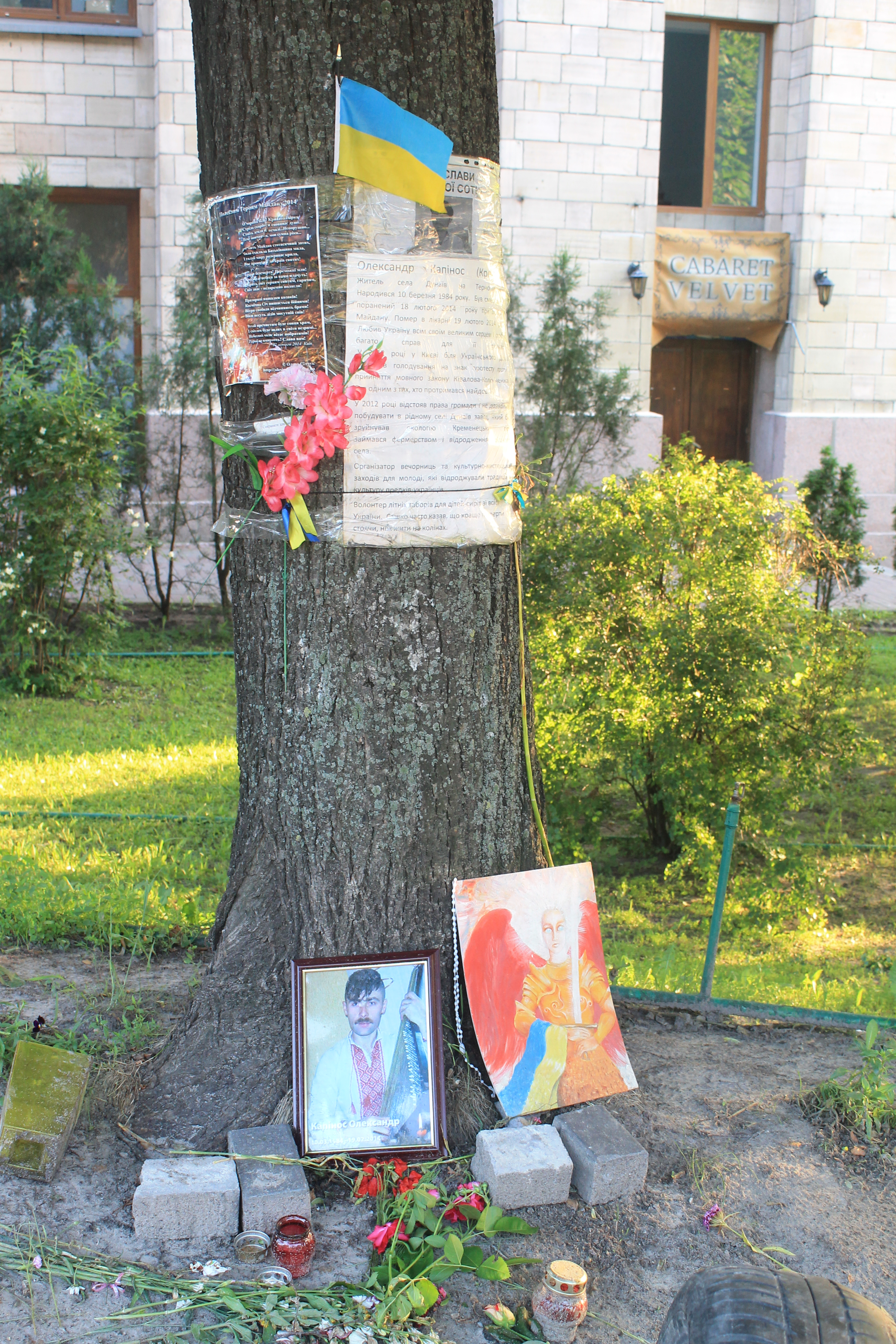
Memorial plaque where Oleksandr Kapinos died

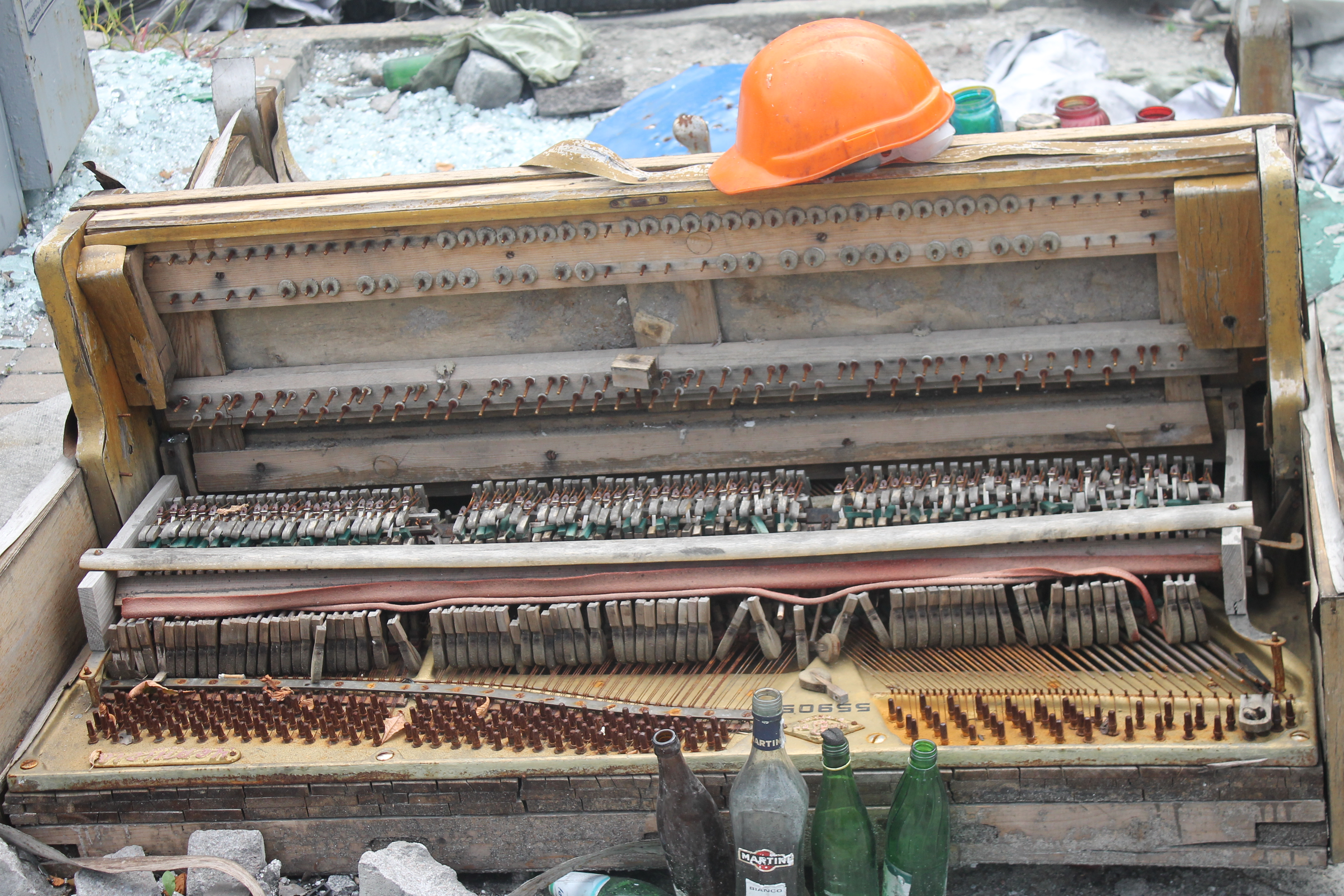
Exhibition of a battle-damaged piano, Molotov cocktail bottles, and a Euromaidan self-defence fighter's helmet

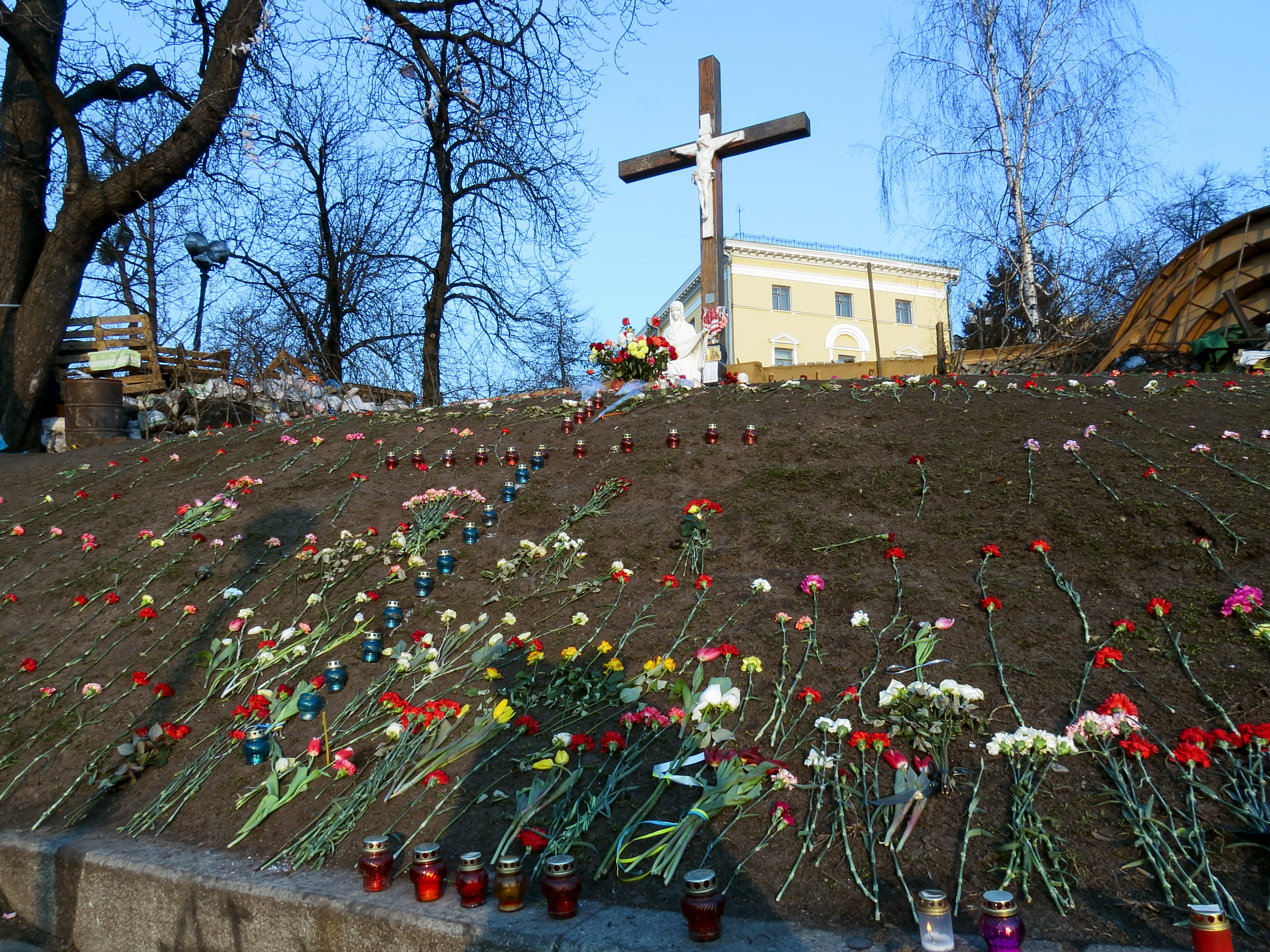
Flowers laid out on the slope of the alley. 9 March 2014

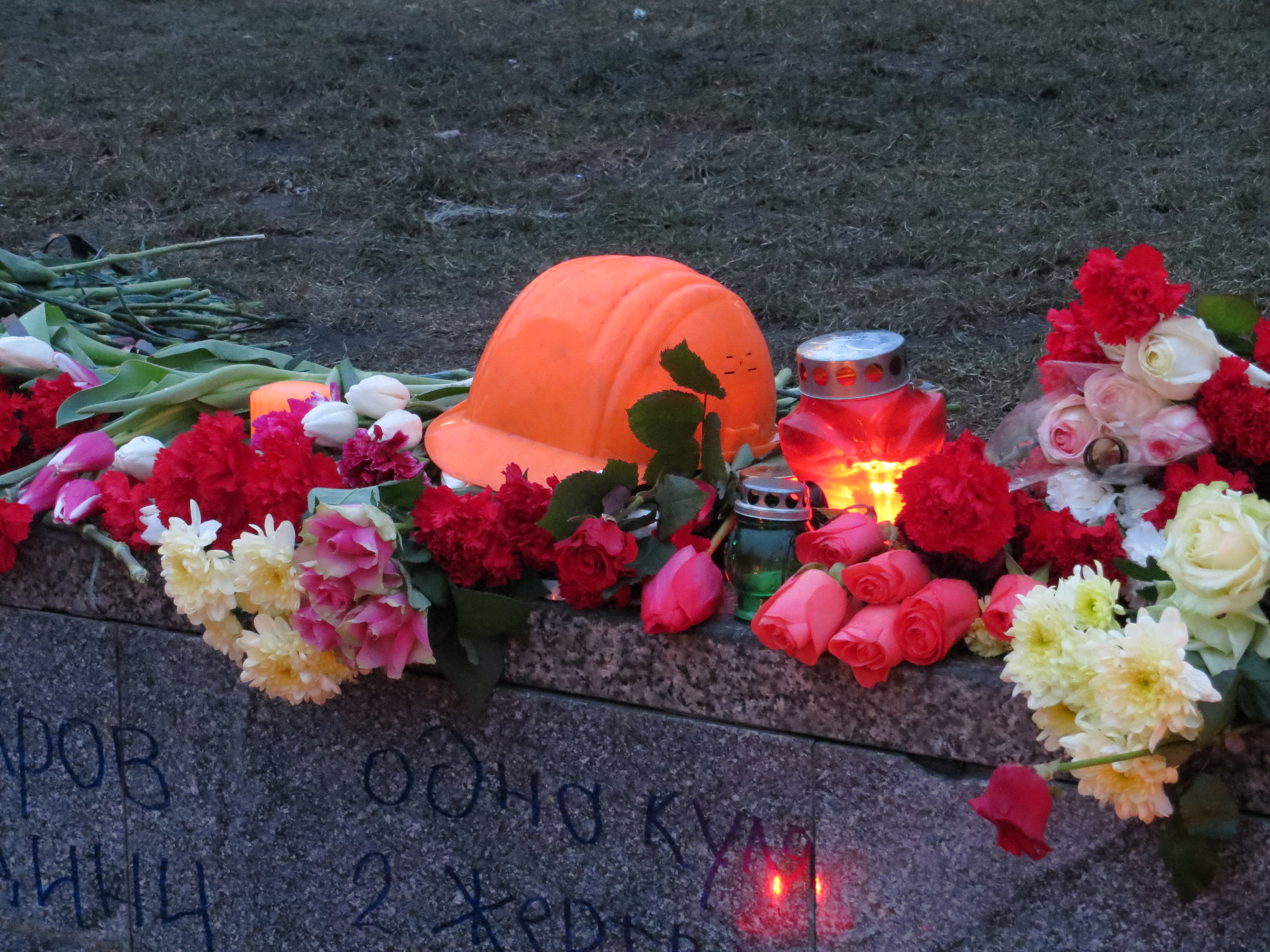
Fragment of a Heavenly Hundred memorial. 23 February 2014

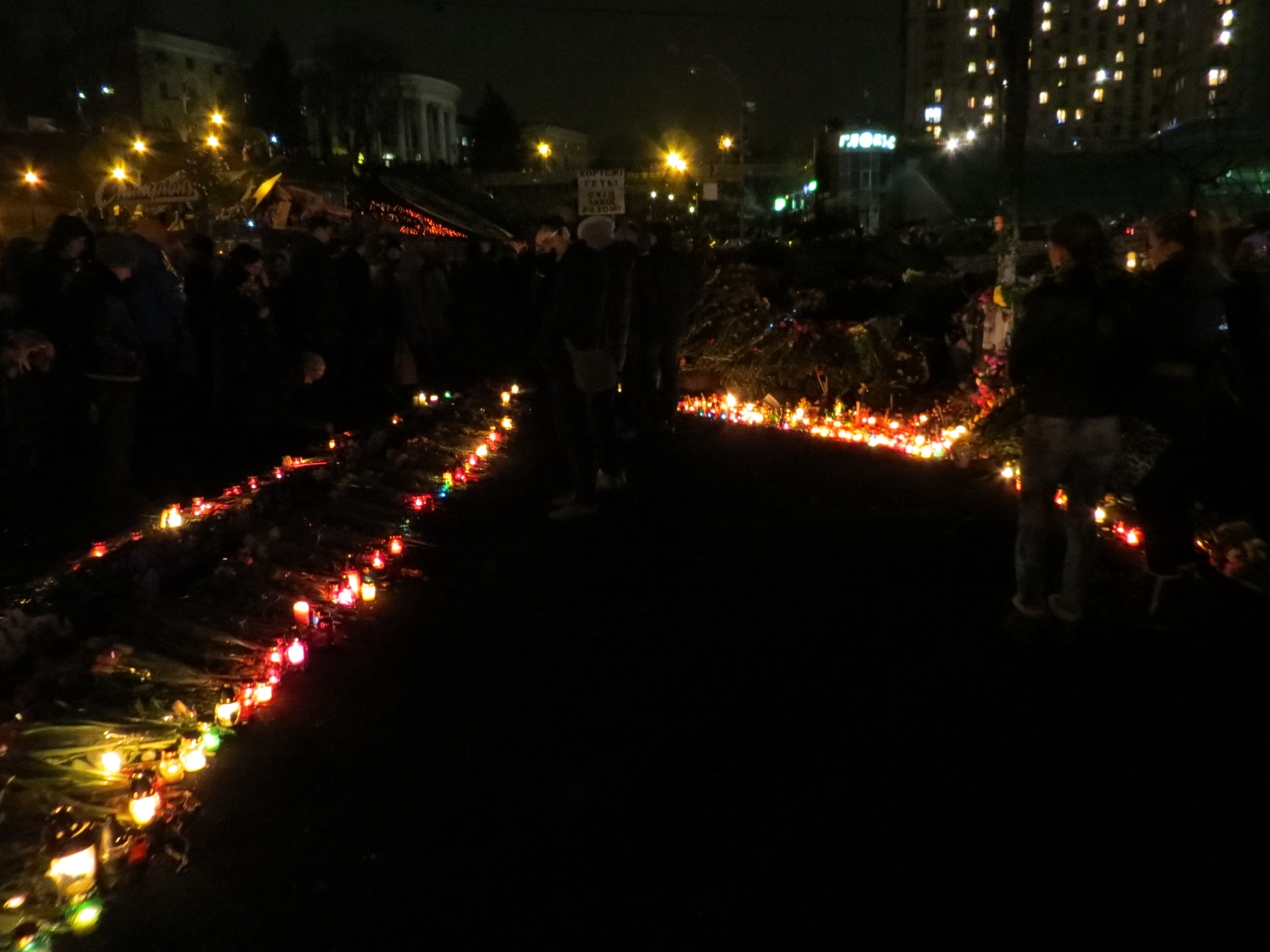
Flowers and candles. 24 February 2014

== Buildings and facilities ==
There are only 7 buildings on the street.

Cultural institutions:

- The October Palace, housing the International Centre of Culture and Arts (No. 1) (Note: addresses)
  - The Cinema Palace (Ukrainian: Кінопалац, romanized: Kinopalac)

Educational institutions:

- Sports School for Children and Youth of the Olympic Reserve (SDYUSHOR) in artistic gymnastics (No. 1)

Libraries:

- Library of the International Centre for Culture and Arts of Trade Unions of Ukraine (No. 1)

Hotels:

- Hotel Ukraine (No. 4) (Note: addresses)

== See also ==
- Bridge over Instytutska Street
- Revolution of Dignity (18–23 February 2014)

== Sources ==
- Web encyclopedia of Kyiv.
- Streets of Kyiv: a handbook. Compiled by A. M. Syhalov and others. Kyiv: Reklama [Advertising], 1975. p. 61. s.v. "Жовтневої революції вул."
- Kudrytskyi, Anatolii Viktorovych; Ponomarenko, Lidiya Antonivna; Riznyk, Oleksandr (1995). Вулиці Києва. Довідник [Streets of Kyiv: a handbook] (in Ukrainian). Kyiv: Ukrainska Entsyklopediia Imeni M.P. Bazhana. p. 86. ISBN 5-88500-070-0. s.v. "Інститутська вулиця".
- "Фотоспомин Київ, якого немає" [A photo memory of Kyiv that doesn't exist] (in Ukrainian). 19 April 2013.
- "Октябрьской Революции улица" [October Revolution Street], in: Kyiv: An Encyclopedic Handbook. A.B. Kudrytsky (editor-in-chief), Kyiv: publishing house Ukrainian Soviet Encyclopedia, 1982. p. 404. (in Russian).
- Героїв Небесної Сотні алея [Alley of the Heroes of the Heavenly Hundred]. Streets of Kyiv: Official Handbook. Appendix to the decision of the Kyiv City Council dated 22 January 2015 No. 34/899 "On approval of the official directory “Streets of Kyiv City"”. p. 48. Archived from the original source on 6 October 2021.
- Героїв Небесної Сотні алея. [Alley of the Heroes of the Heavenly Hundred]. МІАС ЗМД «Містобудівний кадастр Києва». [MIAS ZMD ‘Kyiv Urban Planning Cadastre’].
