= Bridge over Instytutska Street =

Bridge over Institute Street Міст через Інститутську вулицю
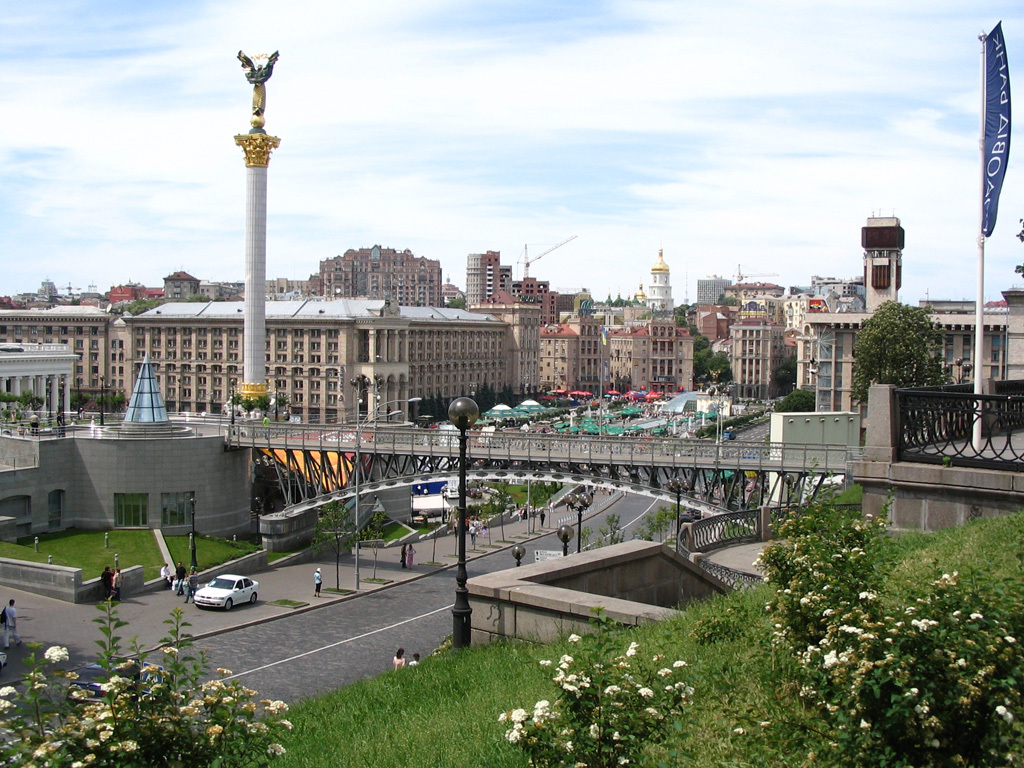
- Coordinates: 50.4496°N 30.5267°E
- Carries: pedestrians
- Crosses: Instytutska Street
- Locale: Kyiv, Ukraine
- Other name: Heavenly Hundred Bridge

History
- Construction start: 2001
- Opened: 2002

Location
- Interactive map of Bridge over Institute Street

The Bridge over Instytutska Street or Institute Street (Ukrainian: Міст через Інститутську вулицю, romanized: Mist cherez Instytutsku vulytsiu), also known as the Heavenly Hundred Bridge (Ukrainian: Міст Небесної сотні, romanized: Mist Nebesnoi sotni), is a pedestrian bridge located at Independence Square in Kyiv that crosses over the Alley of Heroes of the Heavenly Hundred, which until 30 January 2015 was part of Instytutska Street ("Institute Street").

== Description ==
The bridge was built in 2002 and provides a pedestrian viaduct from the October Palace to the Hlobus shopping mall on "Maidan".

During Euromaidan, on 20 February 2014 the bridge caught fire and was damaged.

== Photos ==
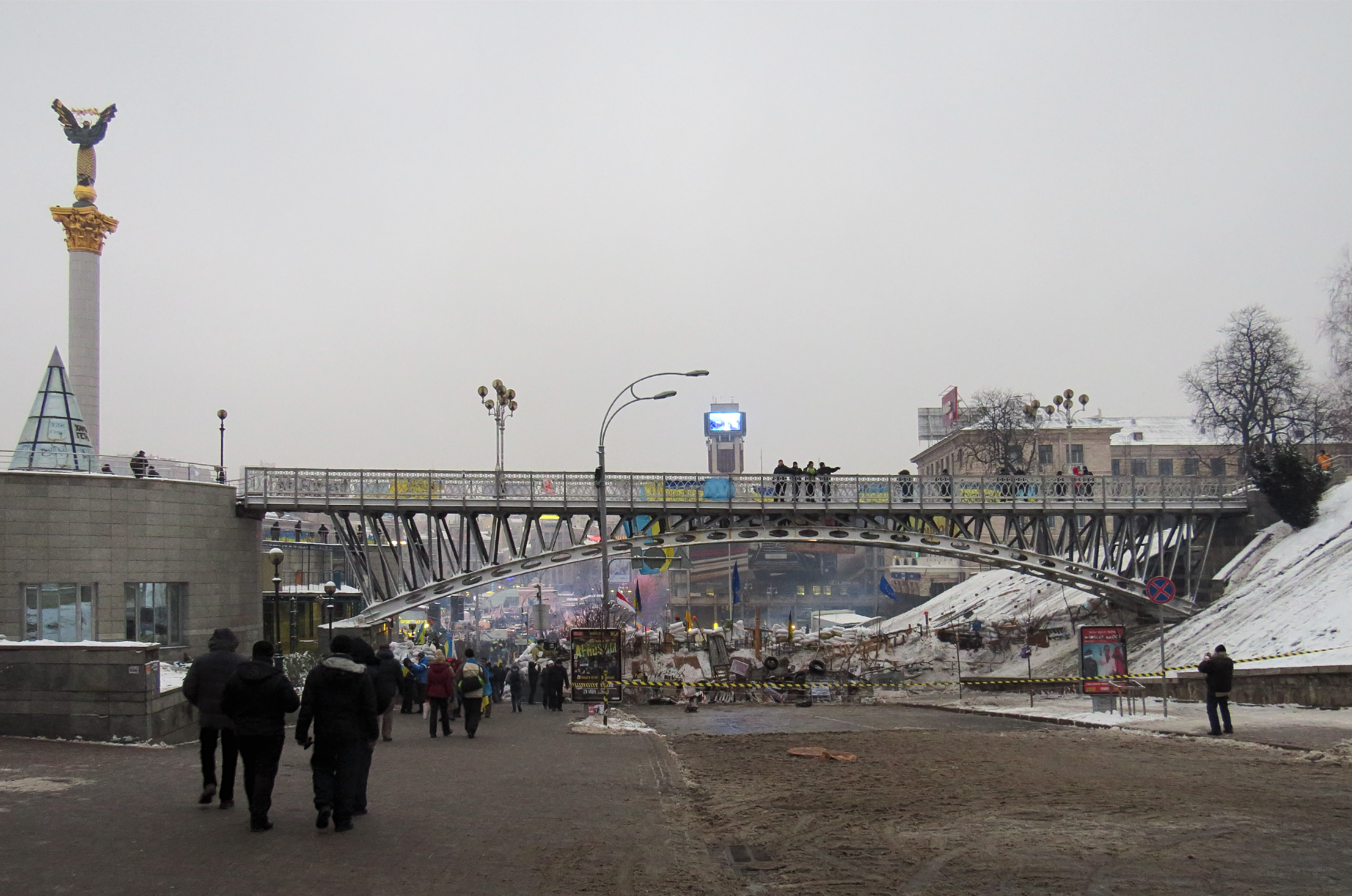
Bridge during the Euromaidan, view onto Maidan

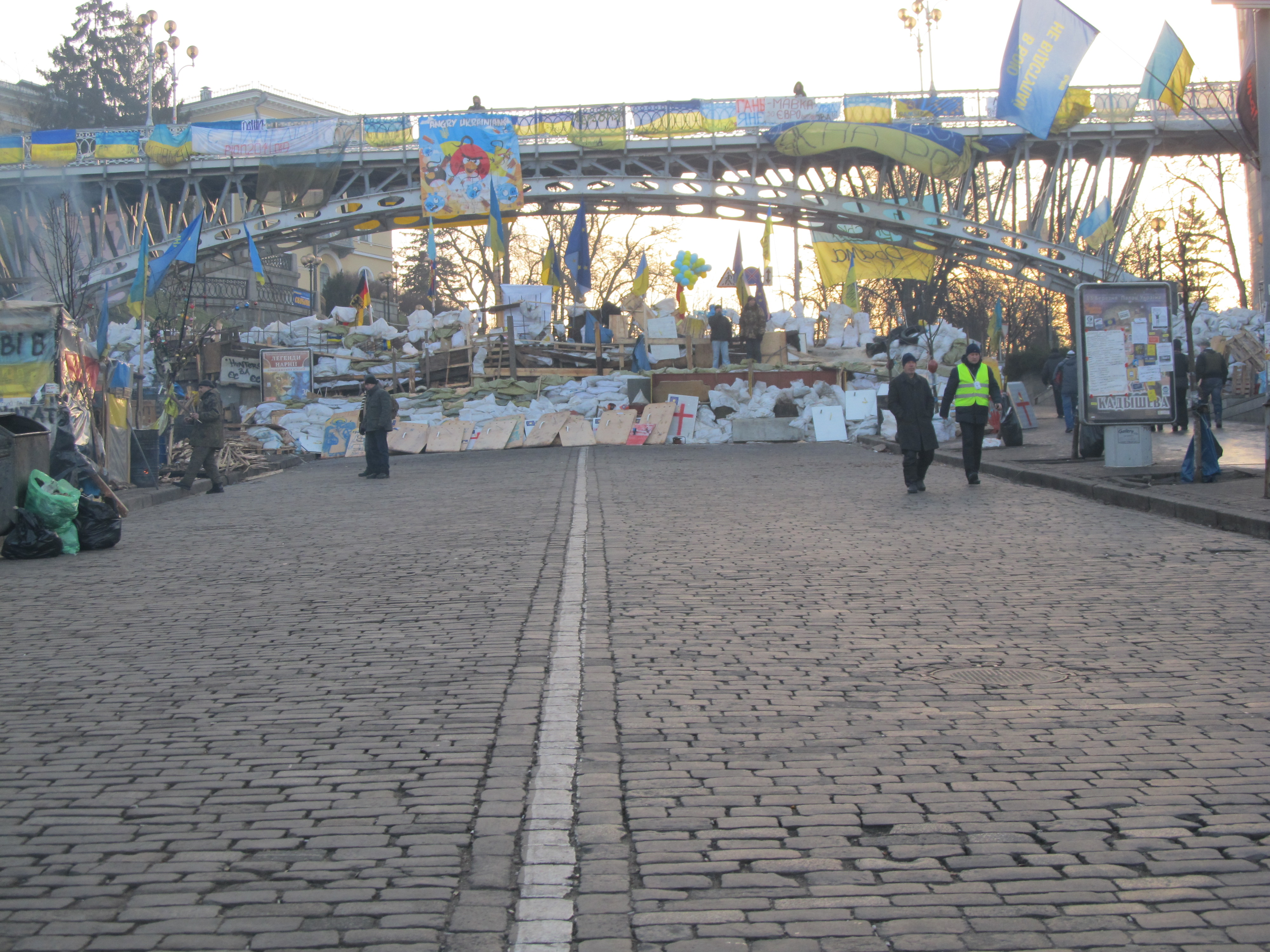
Bridge during the Euromaidan, away from Maidan

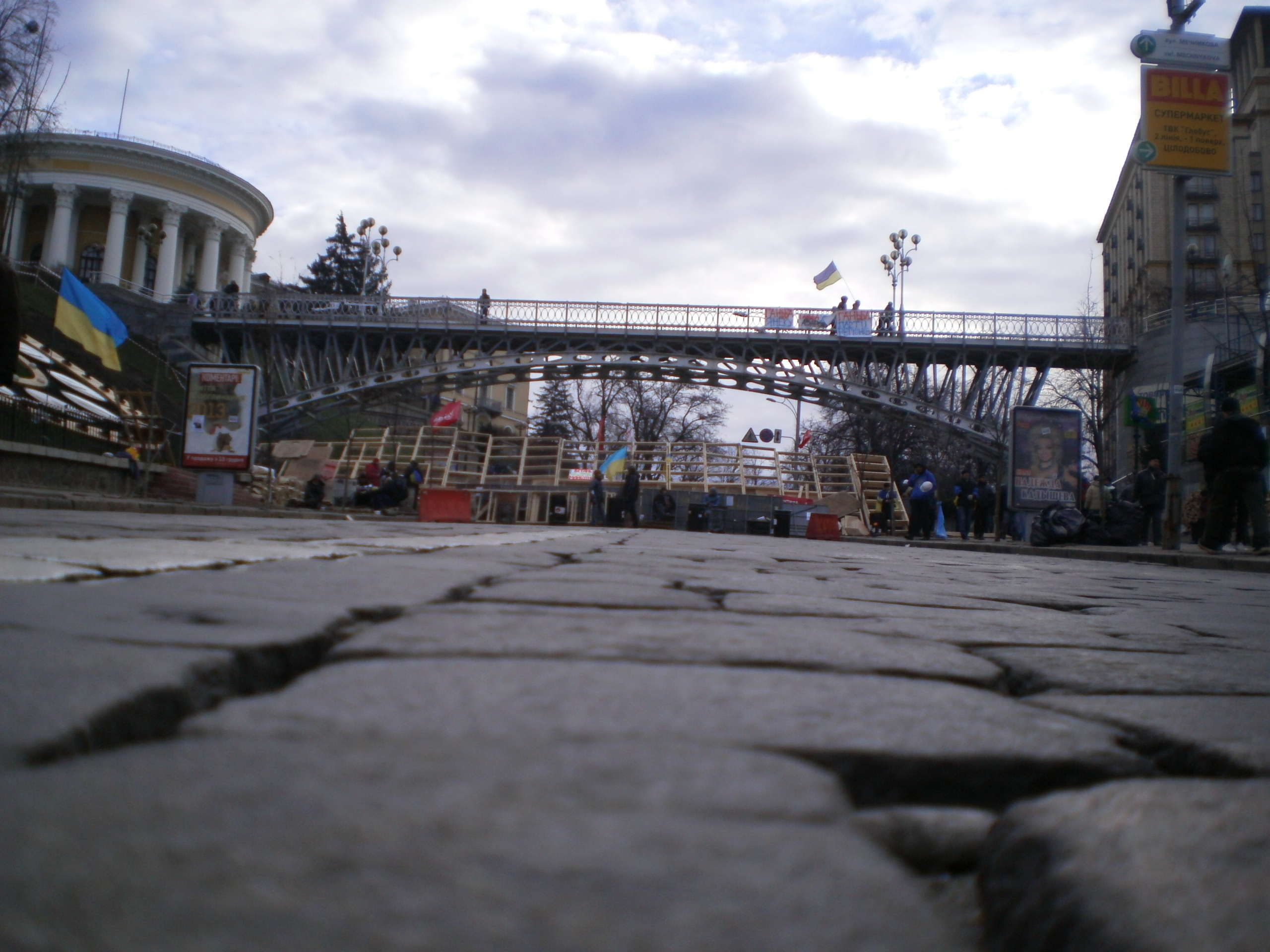
wider view

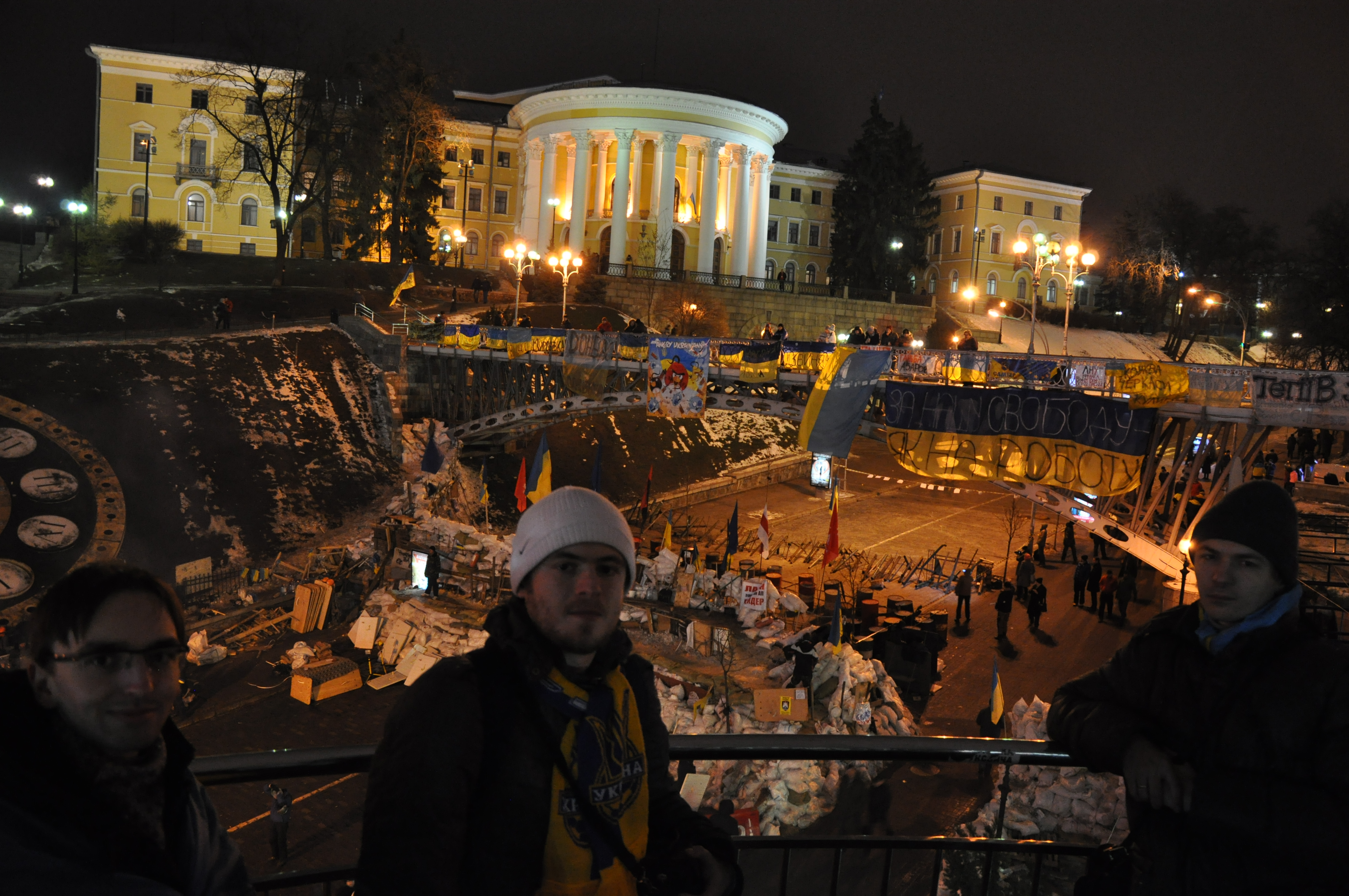
towards October Palace at evening

== See also ==
- Bridges in Kyiv
