= Kyiv Institute for Noble Maidens =

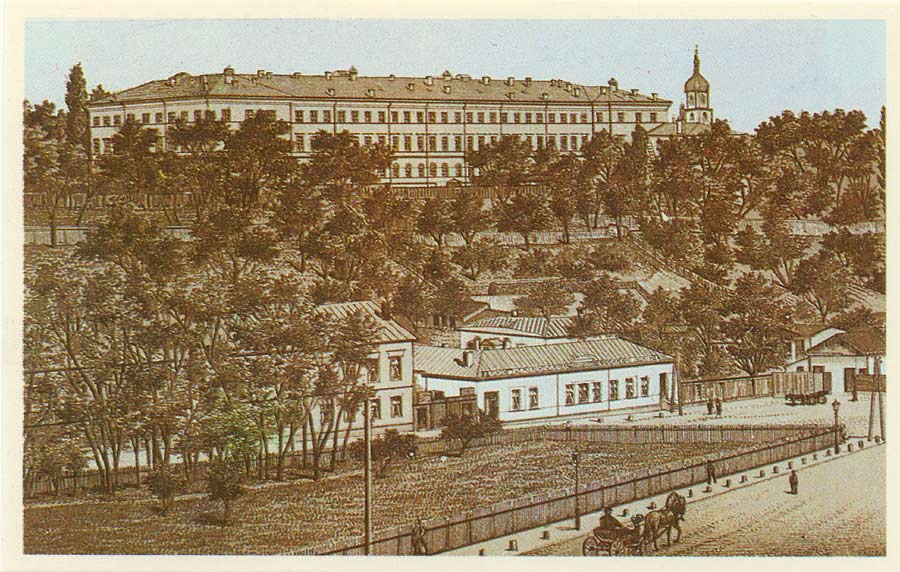
The institute circa 1912

The Kyiv Institute for Noble Maidens (Київський інститут шляхетних дівчат: Kyyivsʹkyy instytut shlyakhetnykh divchat) in Kyiv was the first secondary education institution for girls in Tsarist Ukraine, founded in 1834.

The institute opened its doors in 1834. It was the Ukrainian equivalent to the Smolny Institute in Russia.

The institute educated daughters from noble or Burgher families. Girls who graduated had the right to work as governesses for families of the same social standing.

== See also ==
- Institute for Noble Maidens
