= Ivan Franko Square =

Square in Kyiv, Ukraine

Coordinates: 50.4461°N 30.5274°E

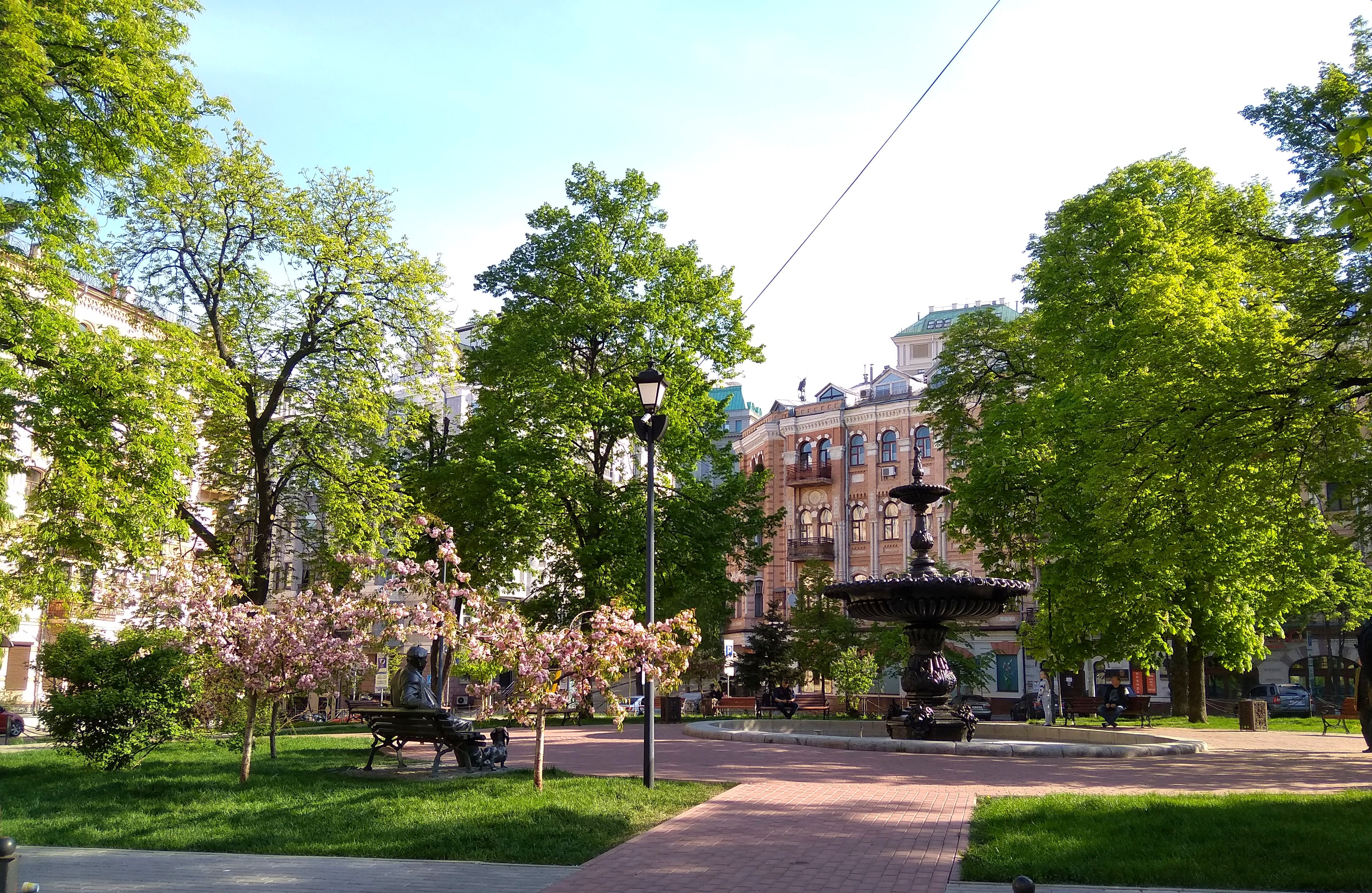
- Ivan Franko Square in Kyiv, 2018
- Type: Square
- Location: Kyiv, Ukraine

Ivan Franko Square (Ukrainian: Площа Івана Франка, romanized: Ploshcha Ivana Franka) is a square in the Pecherskyi District of the city of Kyiv. The Ivan Franko National Academic Drama Theater is at the square, which is situated between Architect Horodetsky Street, Olhynska Street, and Bohdan Stupka Street. A stone staircase connects the square with Bankova Street, which lies at a higher elevation, and where the House with Chimaeras and the Presidential Office of Ukraine are located.

== History ==
The square was designed in 1895–1896 under the name ‘Mykolaivska’ (in honour of tsar Nicholas II, Ukrainian: Mykola II) and was laid out in 1897–1898 on the site of a filled-in pond at the former estate of Kyiv University professor Friedrich Mering.

Between 1896 and 1898, a theatre building was constructed on the new square, where the Russian drama troupe founded by Nikolai Solovtsov performed. Following his death in 1902, the theatre was named the "Solovtsov".

In 1900, the city planning authorities laid out a public garden with a typical fountain in the centre of the square. Among the private buildings surrounding the square, a manor house on the southern side, belonging to the mayor Ipolit Dyakov, stood out. In 1897, a four-storey apartment block adorned with towers was erected here (designed by architect Mykola Dobachevsky), which for a time housed the ‘Bristol’ hotel and later a boys’ grammar school. To the left of it, commissioned by the same Dyakov, a six-storey apartment block in the neoclassical style was built in 1910. In 1941, both buildings were damaged by an explosion and fire; the former was restored with an additional storey and used as the Kyivenerho office, whilst the latter was demolished.

Since 1919 it was called the 'Spartak Square', in honour of Spartacus, the gladiator and leader of the largest slave revolt in the late Roman Republic.

In the local historian Dmytro Malakov’s 2005 book Kyiv. 1939–1945. Post scriptum: a photo album, a photograph from 1943 is included, suggesting that during the Nazi occupation of Kyiv from 1941 to 1943, the square was called фон Шлейфер (German: Von Schleiferplatz). However, based on a number of indicators, historians now consider this photograph to be a Soviet propaganda hoax.

Since 1944, the square has carried the name ‘Franko Square’, named in honour of Ivan Franko. The name was later clarified to ‘Ivan Franko Square’.

The square is home to the Ivan Franko National Academic Drama Theatre, which was based on the former premises of the ‘Solovtsov’ Theatre since 1926.

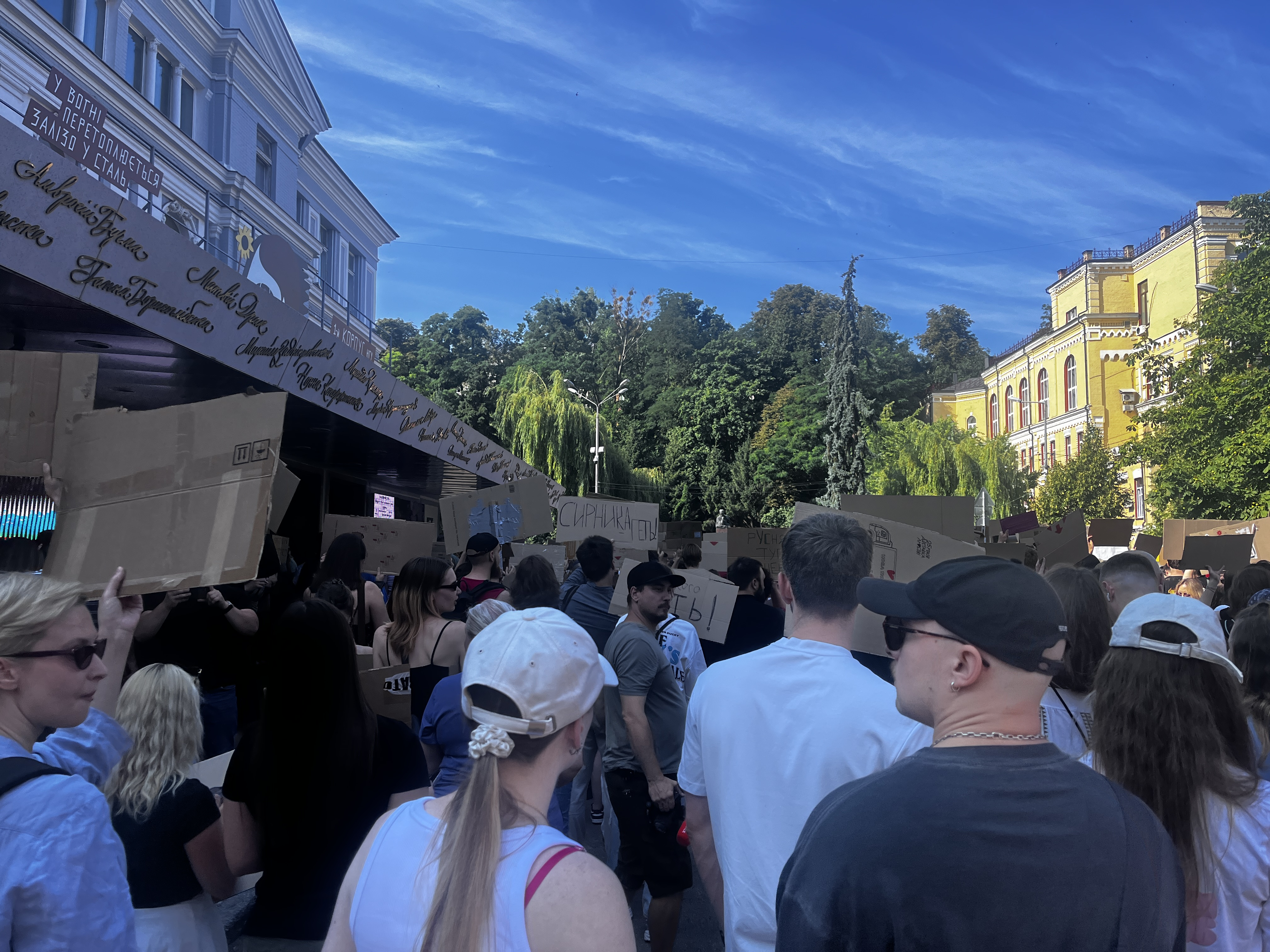
Ukrainians, with various signage, protest in favour of Fedorov, July 2026

Monuments have been erected here: on the site of Dyakov’s lost house stands a monument to Ivan Franko (unveiled in 1956, sculptors Oksana Suprun and [ Anatoliy Bilostotsky, and designed by architect Mykola Ivanchenko), in the square’s central garden — monuments to the Ukrainian actors Mykola Yakovchenko and Hnat Yura (sculptors Volodymyr and Oleksii Chepelyky), near the entrance to the chamber theatre — a commemorative sculpture of the director Serhii Danchenko (sculptors Volodymyr and Oleksii Chepelyky).

In 2005, a restored early 20th-century transformer substation was installed in front of the Kyivenerho building. It served as a unique memorial to mark the 115th anniversary of the creation of the city’s electricity network and the 75th anniversary of the founding of Kyivenerho.

In July 2026, Ivan Franko Square was the site of protests against the dismissal of Mykhailo Fedorov as Minister of Defence of Ukraine, with thousands of demonstrators calling for his restoration and the dismissal of Oleksandr Syrskyi as Commander-in-Chief.

== Notable figures associated with Ivan Franko Square ==
From 1911, Building No. 5 housed the 8th Gymnasium (as it was named from 1915), which was reorganised into a vocational school in the early 1920s. Serge Lifar, an outstanding dancer, was a pupil at the grammar school from 1914 to 1919. A commemorative plaque has been installed on the building in his honour. At Vocational School No. 79, which was subsequently housed here, the future president of the Academy of Sciences of the Soviet Union, Anatoly Alexandrov, taught physics from 1925 to 1928, whilst another future President of the Ukrainian SSR Academy of Sciences, Borys Paton, was a pupil there.

== See also ==
- Ivan Franko Street, Kyiv

== Gallery ==
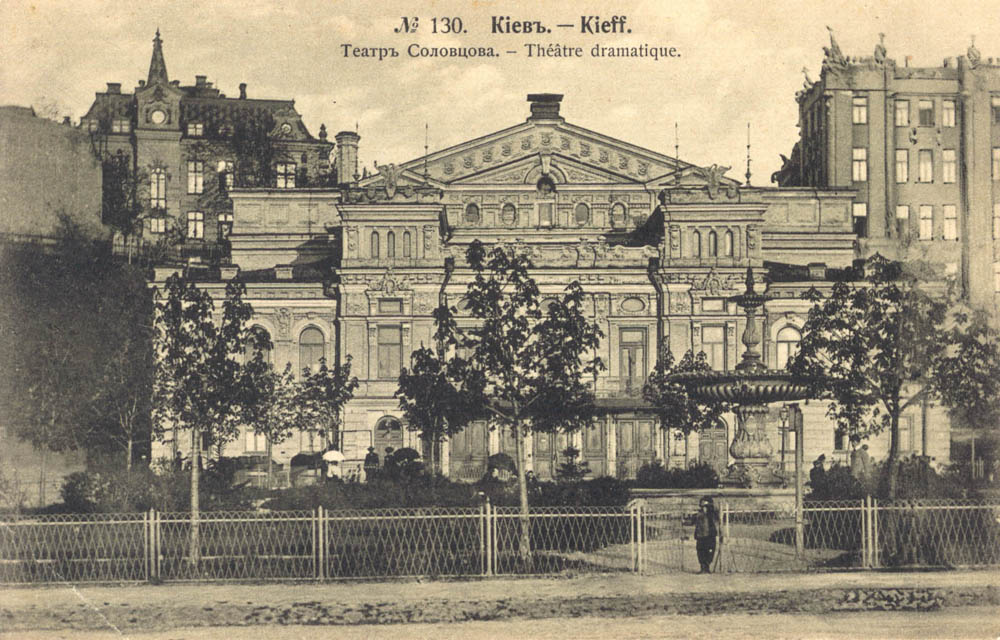
The ‘Solovtsov’ Theatre and the public garden on Mykolaivska Square, early 20th century

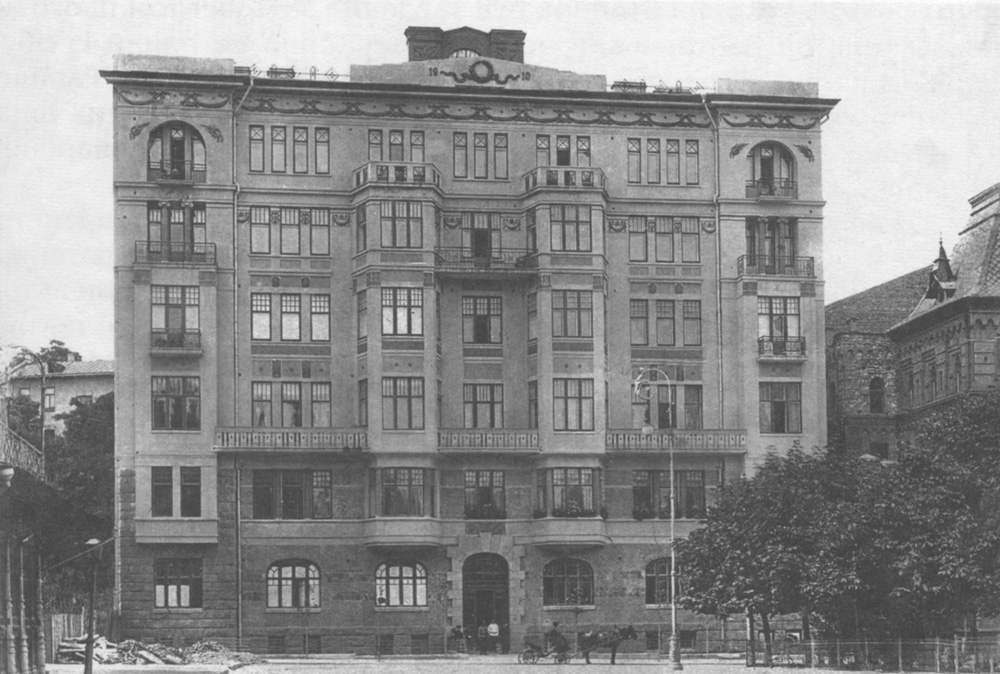
I. Dyakov’s six-storey building on Mykolaivska Square in the 1910s

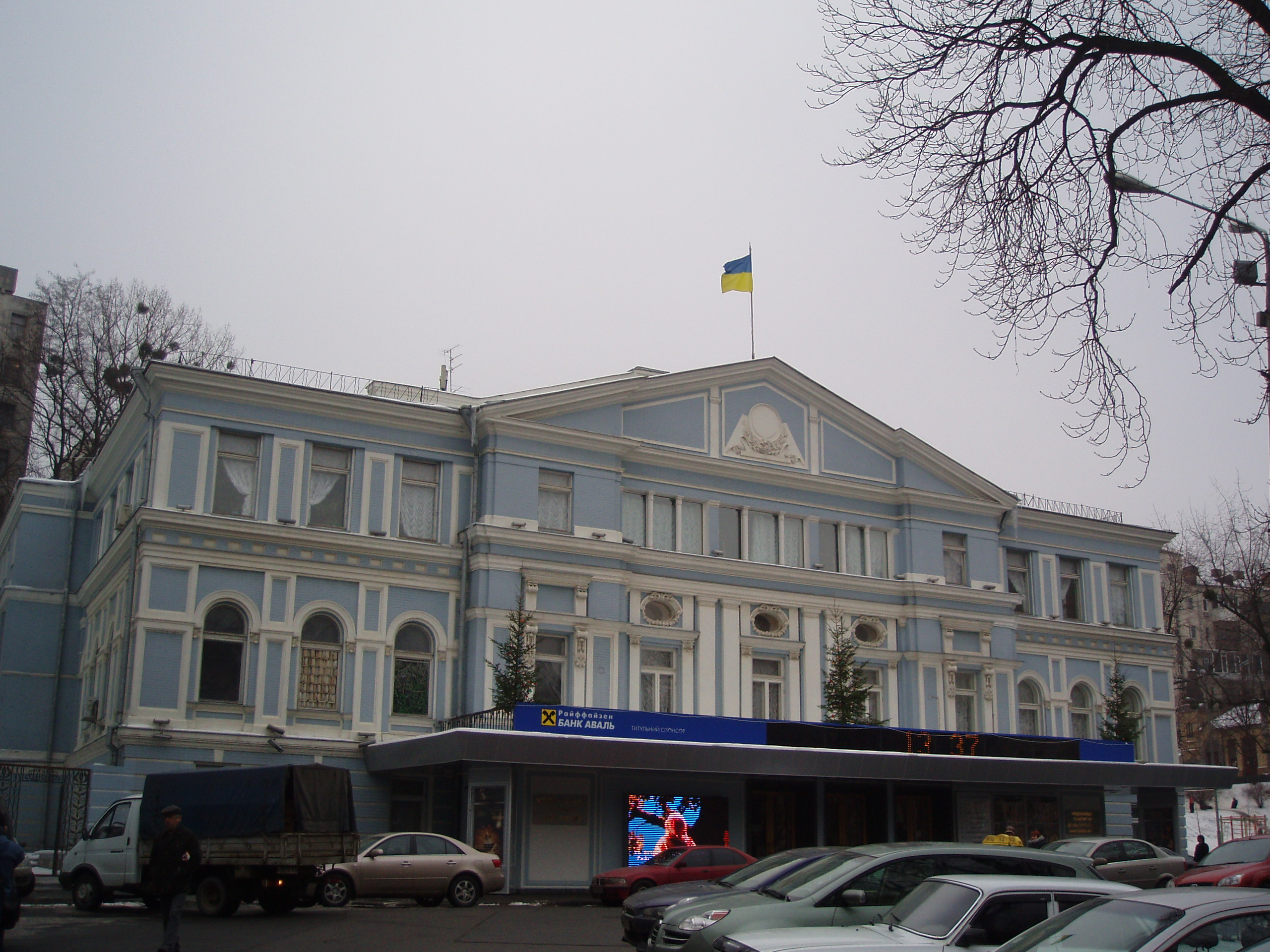
The Ivan Franko National Academic Drama Theatre (2009)

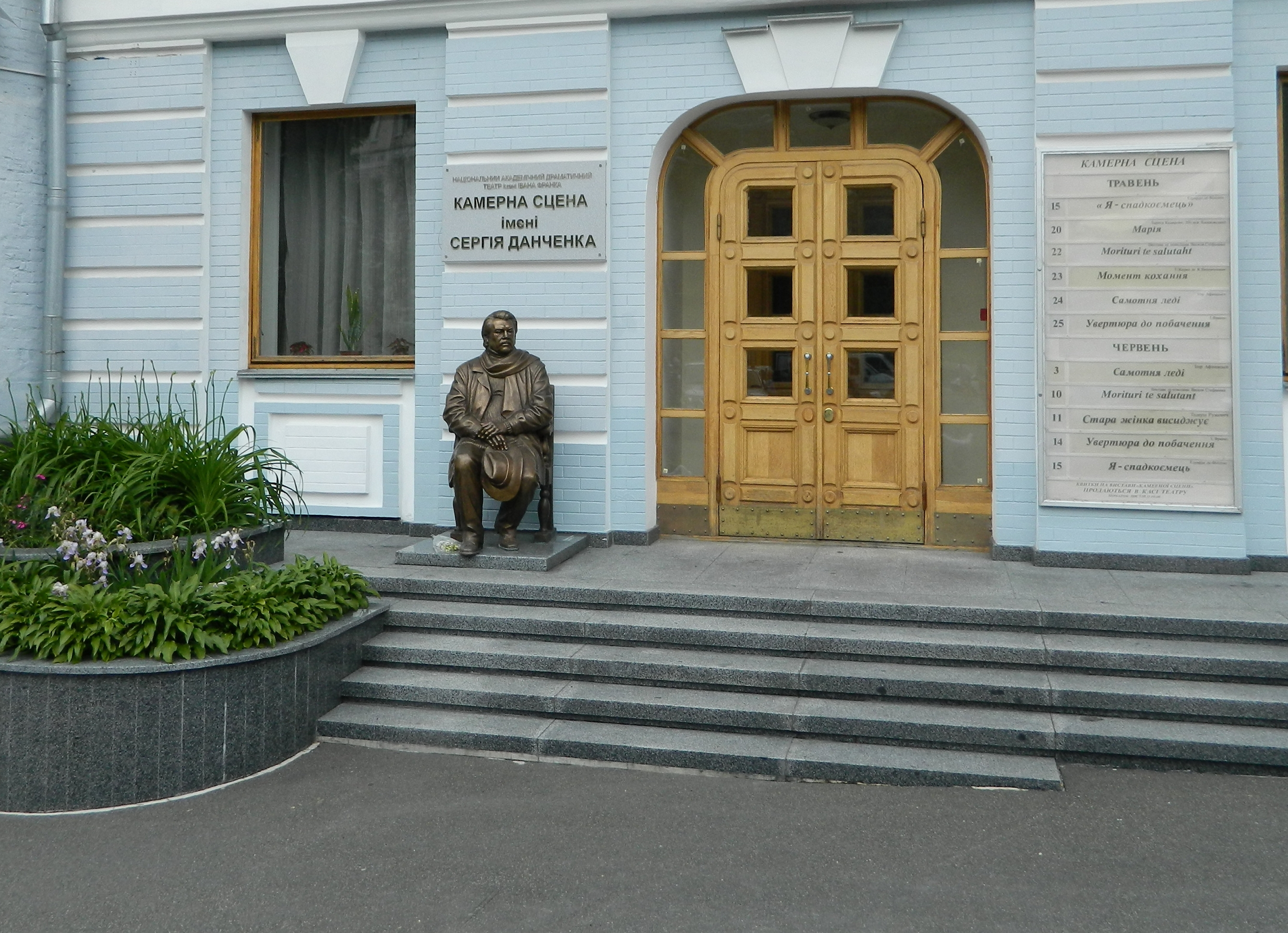
The entrance to the Serhii Danchenko Chamber Theatre. On the left is a sculpture of Danchenko

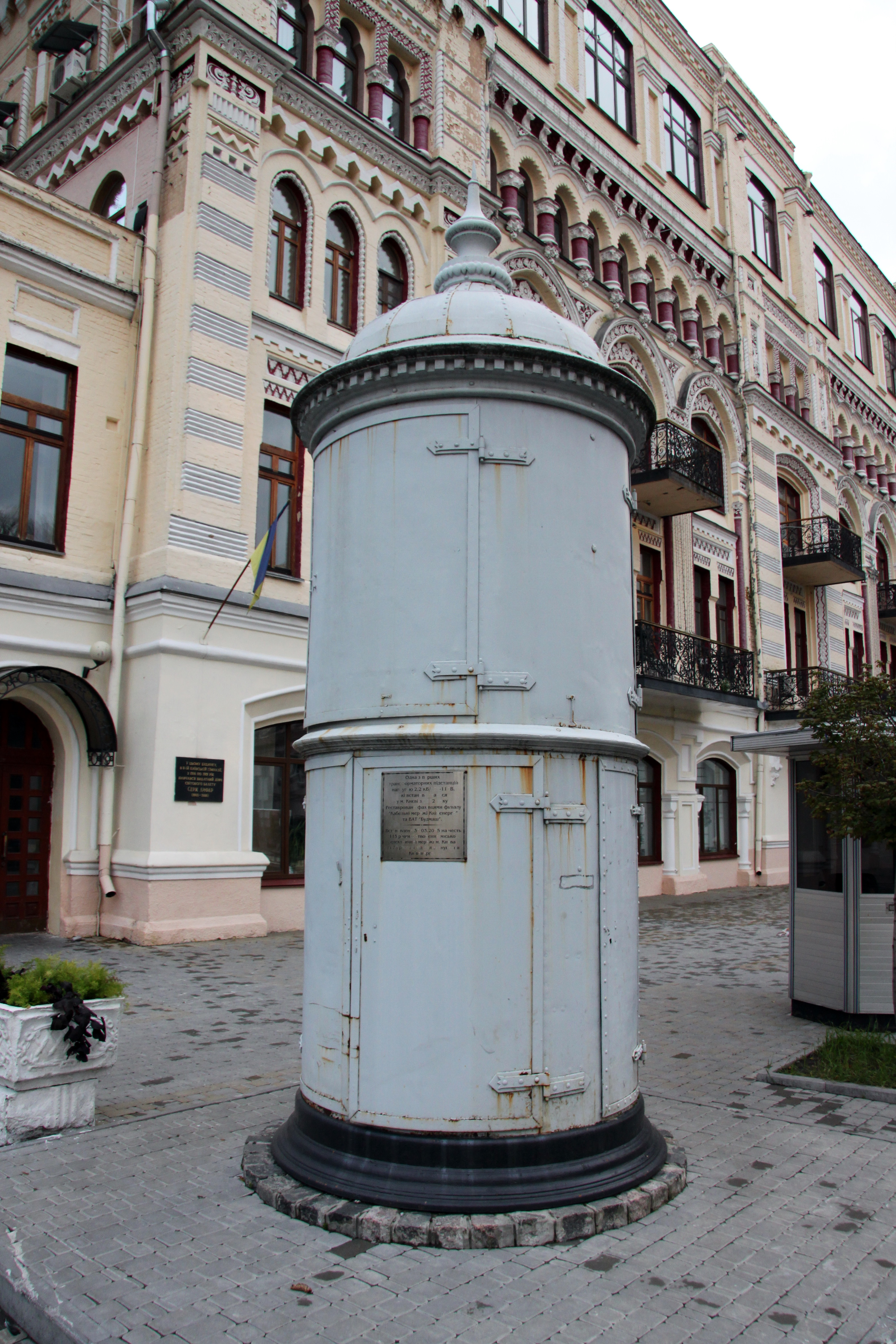
A commemorative structure at the transformer substation near the Kyivenerho building

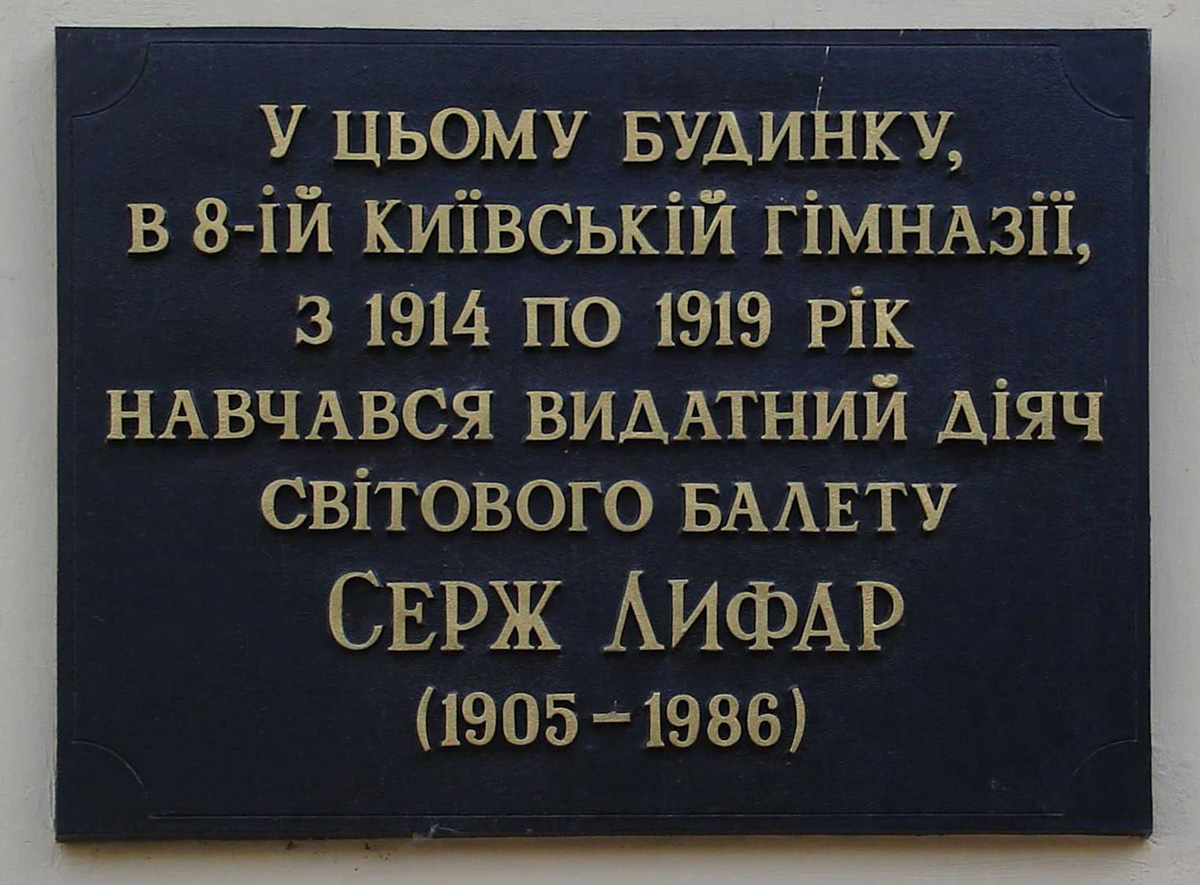
A commemorative plaque in honour of Serge Lifar

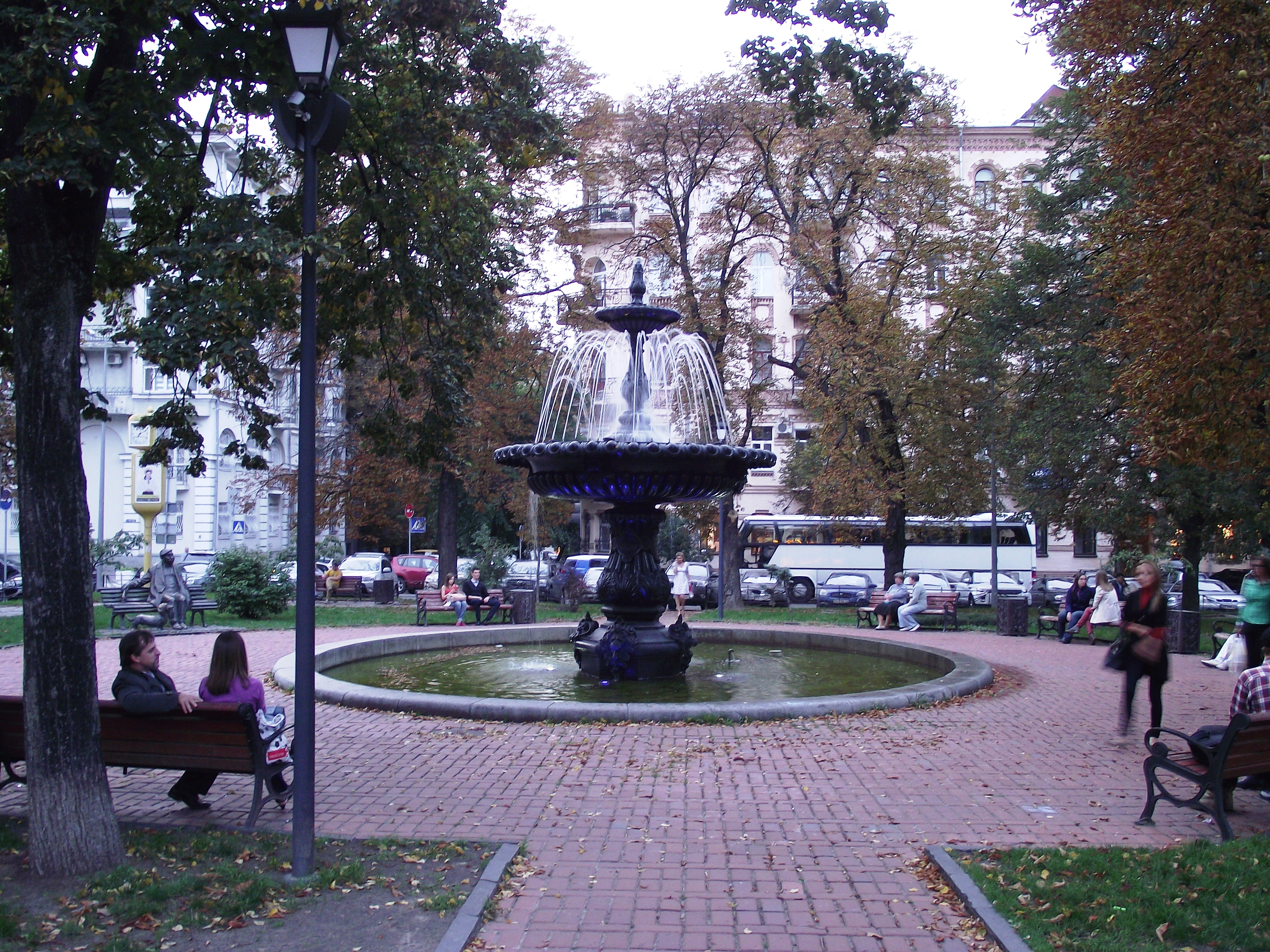
Ivank Franko Square fountain (2013)

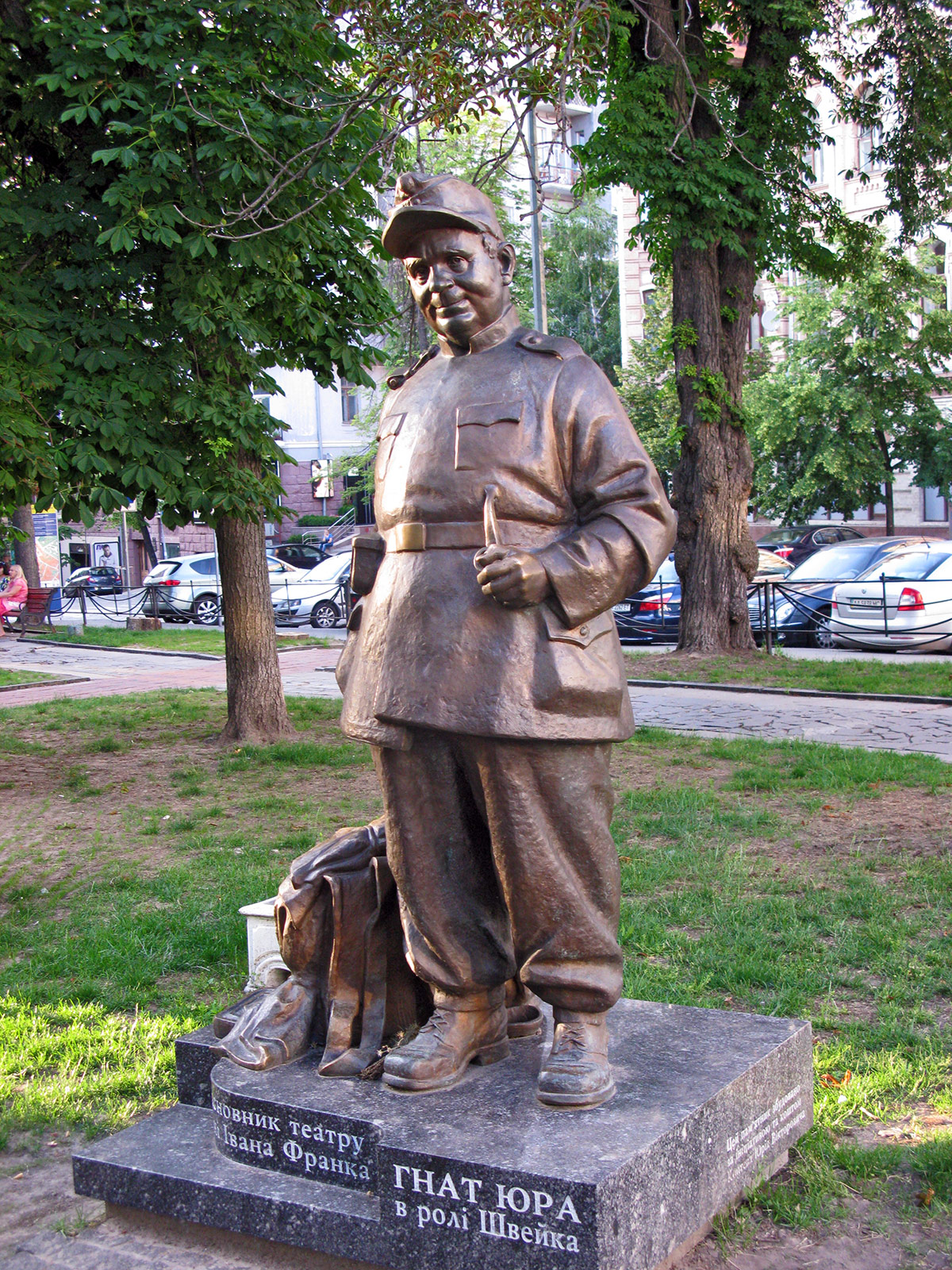
A monument to Hnat Yura in the role of Shvejk the soldier (2013)

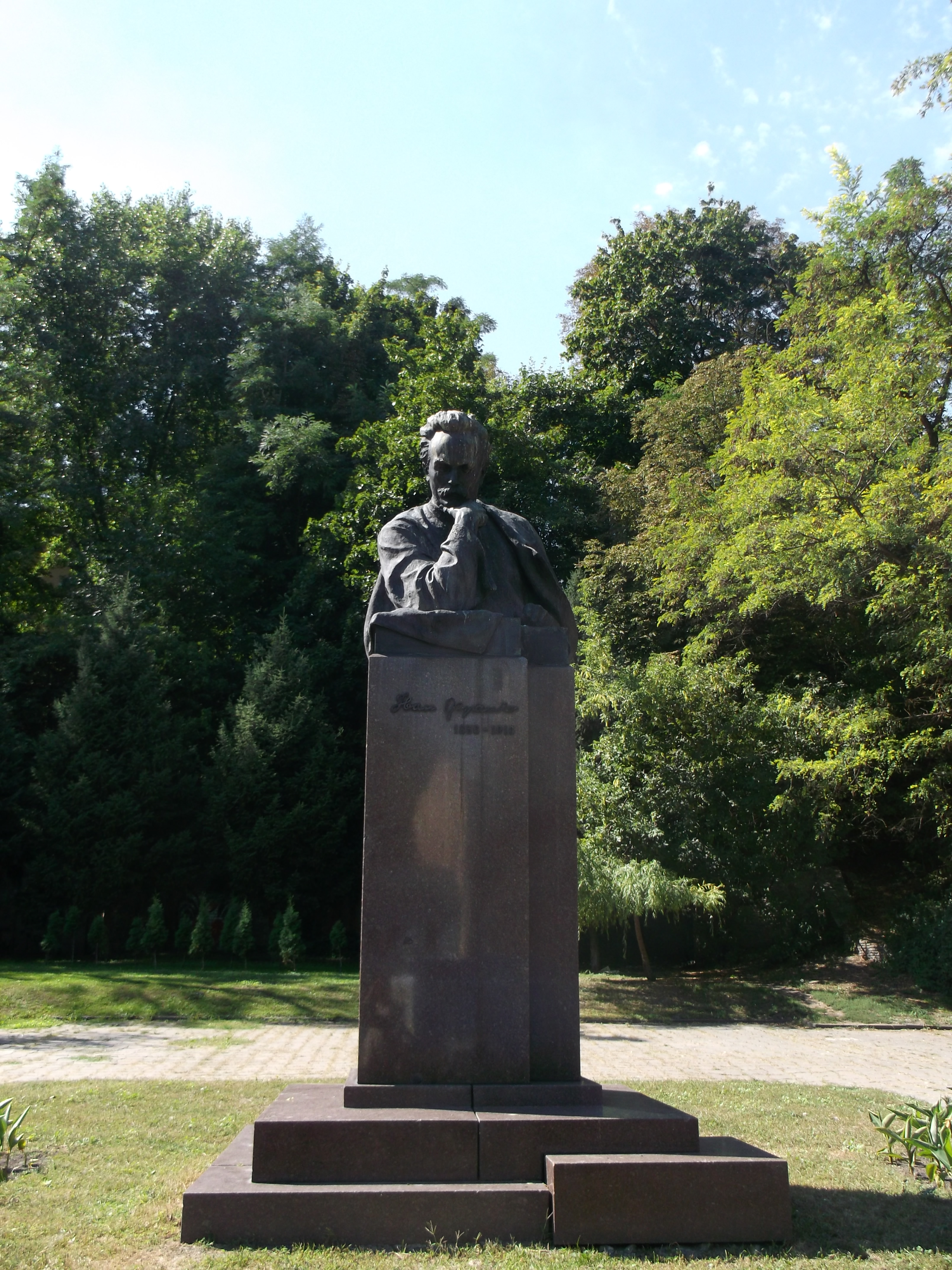
Monument to Ivan Franko (2012)

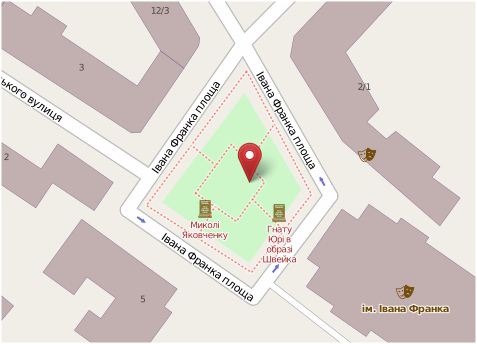
Map of the square (2013)

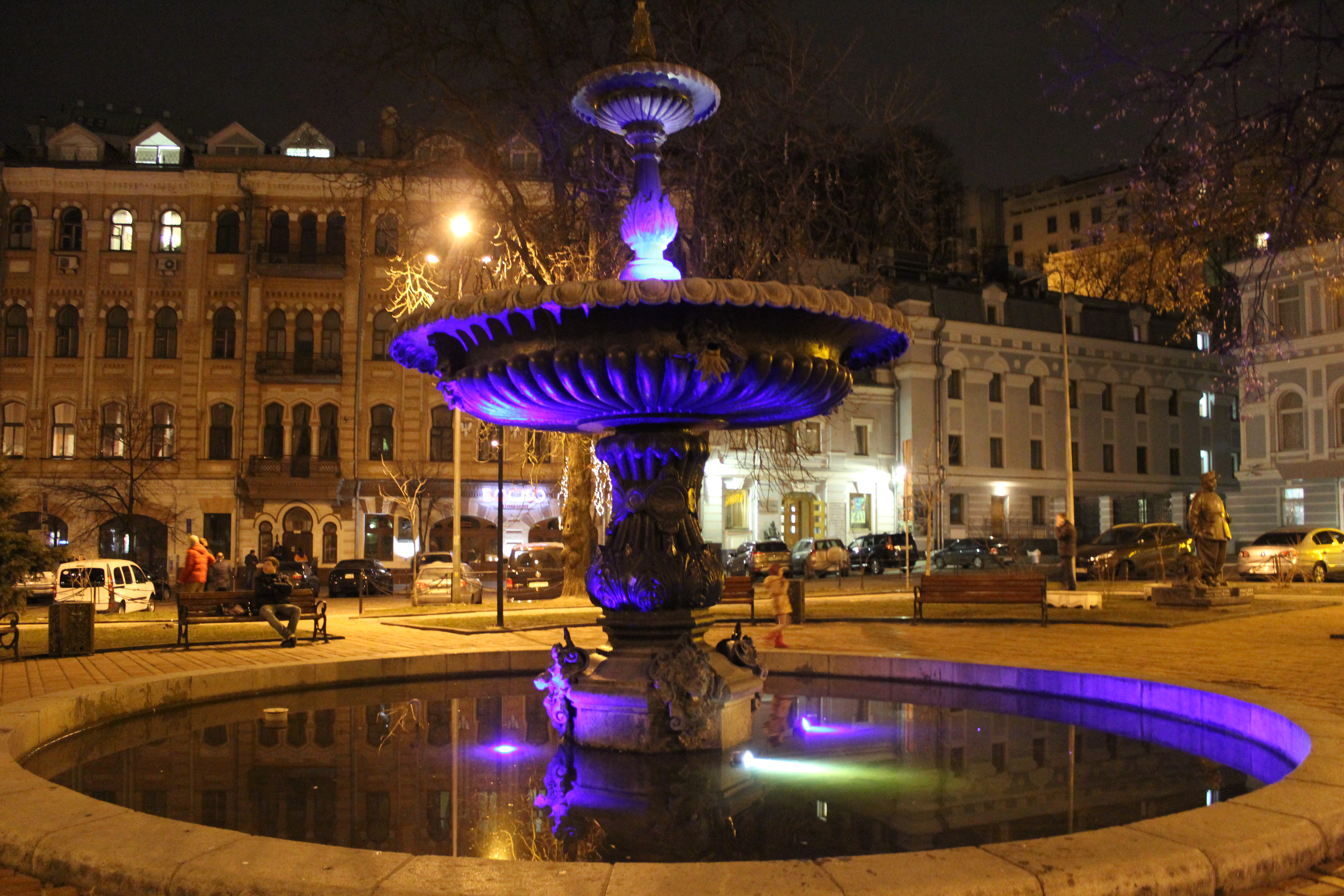
Fountain at night (2016)

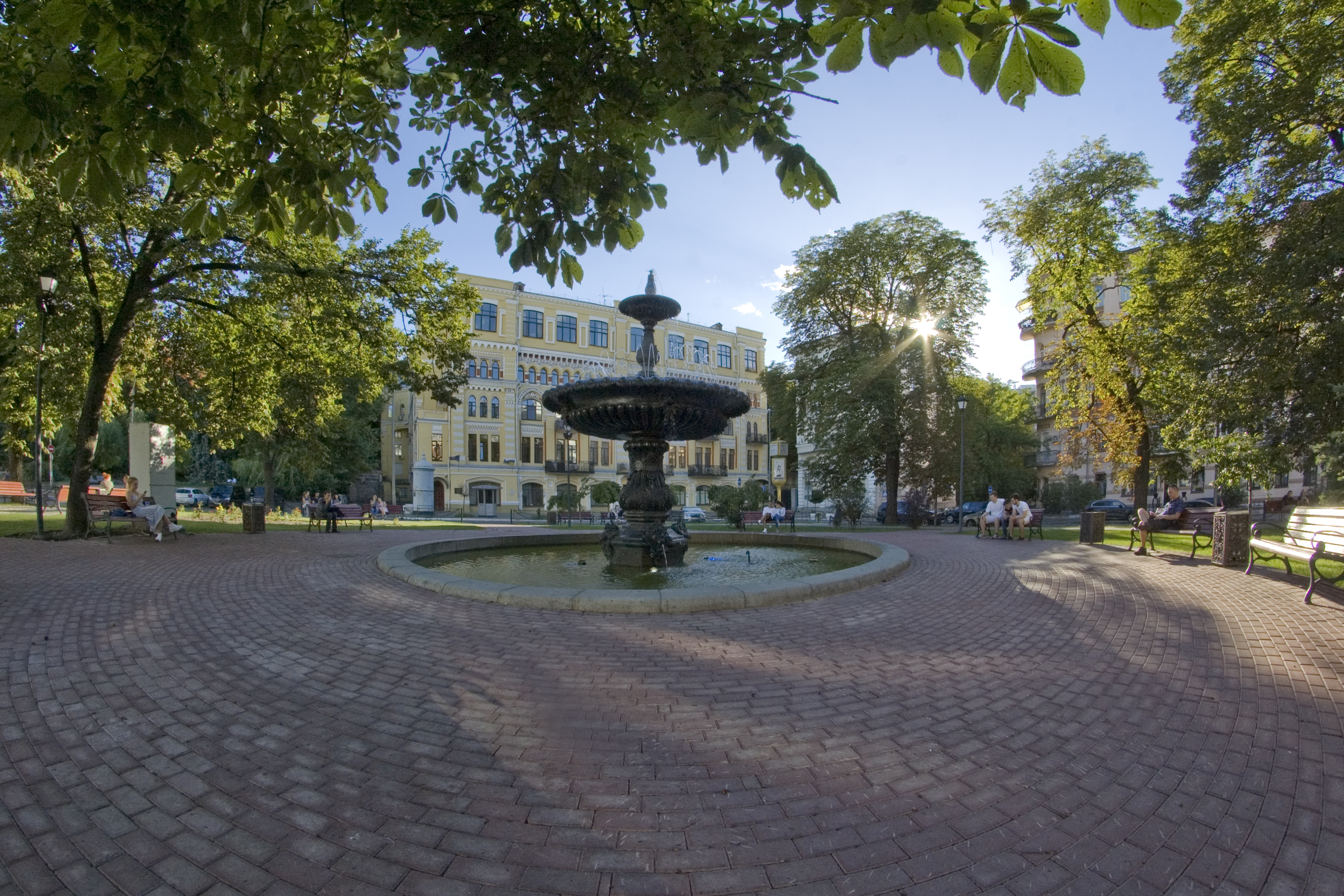
Square in 2017

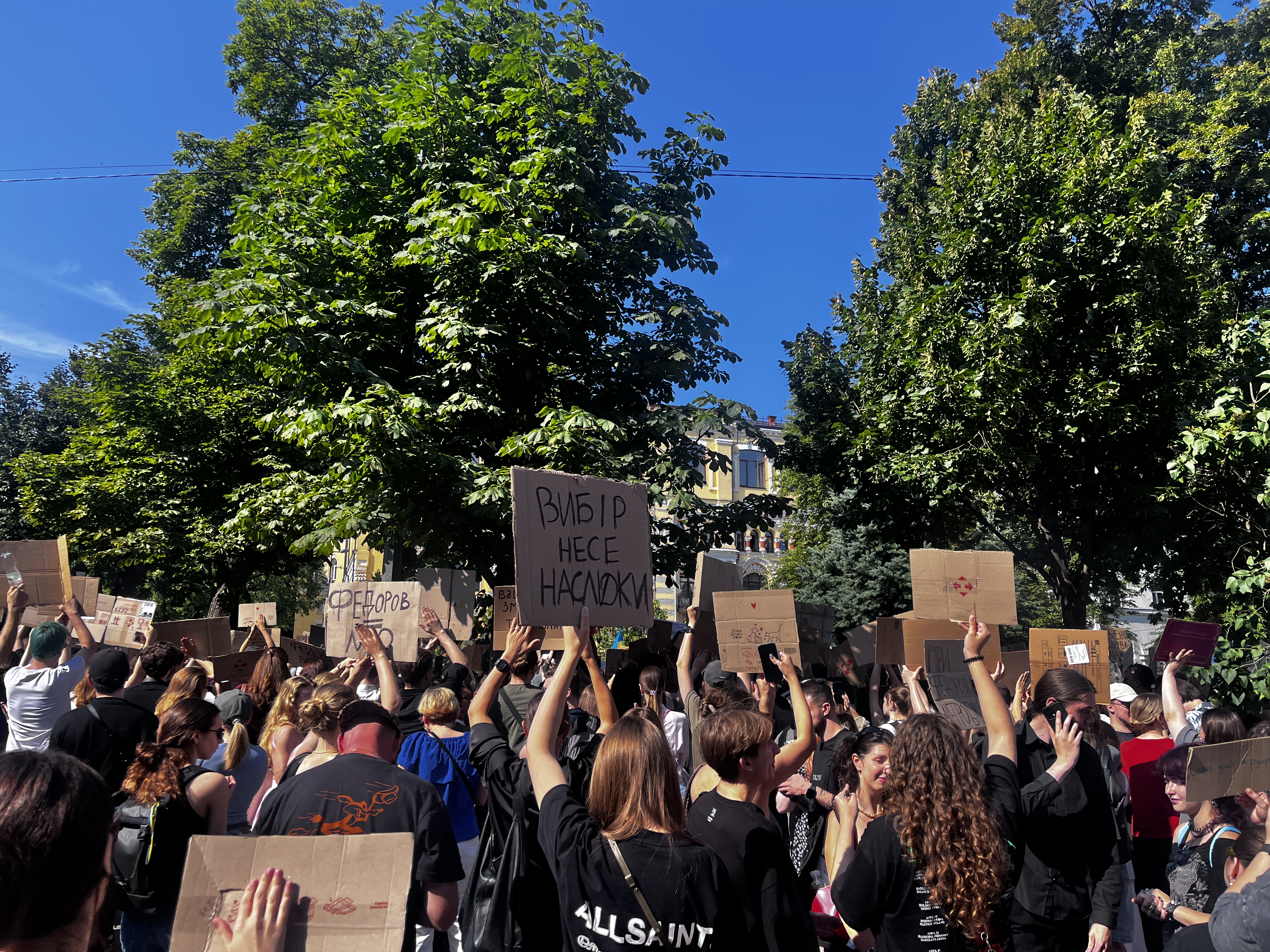
Protests against the dismissal of Mykhailo Fedorov (16 July 2026)

== Sources ==
- Web encyclopedia of Kyiv.
- Streets of Kyiv: a handbook. Compiled by A. M. Syhalov and others. Kyiv: Reklama [Advertising], 1975. p. 172.
- Kudrytskyi, Anatolii Viktorovych; Ponomarenko, Lidiya Antonivna; Riznyk, Oleksandr (1995). Вулиці Києва. Довідник [Streets of Kyiv: a handbook] (in Ukrainian). Kyiv: Ukrainska Entsyklopediia Imeni M.P. Bazhana. p. 236. ISBN 5-88500-070-0.
- Франка Івана площа [Ivan Franko Square], in: Streets of Kyiv: Official Handbook. Appendix to the decision of the Kyiv City Council dated 22 January 2015 No. 34/899. p. 287.
- Франка Івана площа [Ivan Franko Square], in: Kyiv: An Encyclopedic Handbook (1981) / ed. A. V. Kudrytsky. Kyiv. p. 656.
  - in the 1982 Russian edition: pp. 609–610.
- Kalnytskyi, Mykhailo (2012). Зодчество и зодчие [Architecture and Architects]. Киевские истории; кн. 2 (in Russian). Kyiv: Barto. ISBN 978-966-2321-22-7.
- Kalnytskyi, Mykhailo (2014). Гимназии и гимназисты [Grammar schools and grammar school pupils]. Киевские истории; кн. 3 (in Russian). Kyiv: Barto. ISBN 978-966-2321-27-2.
- Malakov, Dmytro (2005). Київ. 1939–1945. Post scriptum: фотоальбом [Kyiv. 1939–1945. Postscript: a photo album] (in Ukrainian). Kyiv: Kyi.
- Sebta, T. M. (April 2013), Топонімія Києва і Рівного у 1941–1944 : тенденції і характер перейменувань [Place-names in Kyiv and Rivne, 1941–1944: trends and nature of the renaming process], Пам'ятки України: історія та культура [Sights of Ukraine: History and Culture] (in Ukrainian), vol. 4, no. 187, pp. 38–51
