= Ivan Franko Street, Kyiv =

Street in Shevchenkivskyi District, Kyiv, Ukraine

Ivan Franko Street
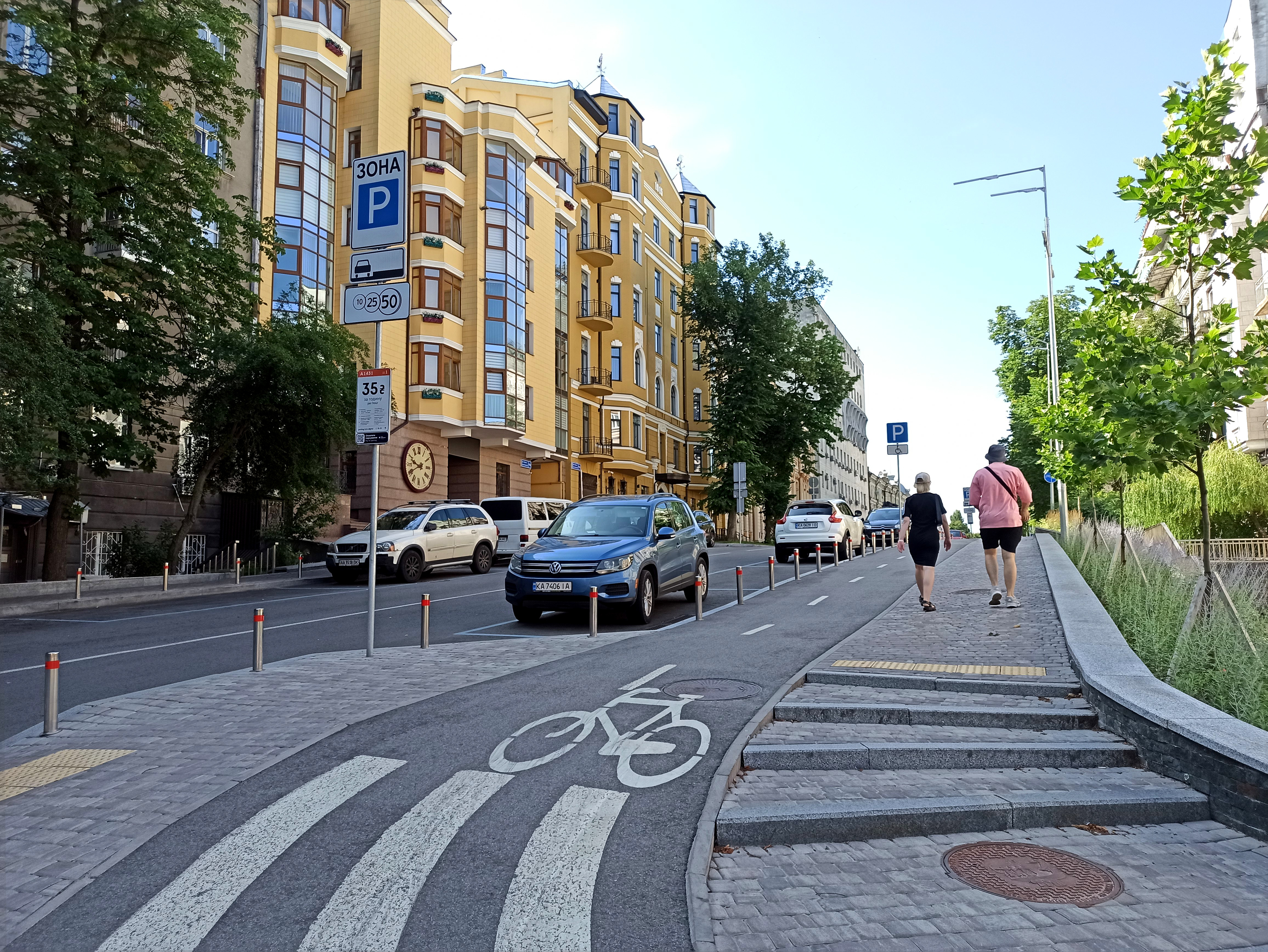
- Bicycle path in Ivan Franko Street, July 2023
- Native name: Вулиця Івана Франка (Ukrainian)
- Namesake: Ivan Franko
- Length: 710 m (2,330 ft)
- Location: Afanasiivskyi Yar, Shevchenkivskyi District, Kyiv, Ukraine
- Postal code: 01030, 01034
- Coordinates: 50°27′2.8″N 30°30′36.9″E

Ivan Franko Street or Ivana Franka Street (Ukrainian: Вулиця Івана Франка, romanized: Vulycja Ivana Franka) is a street in the Shevchenkivskyi District of the city of Kyiv, in the Afanasiivskyi Yar neighbourhood. It runs from Yaroslav's Wall Street to Taras Shevchenko Boulevard.

Ivan Franko Street is connected with Vyacheslav Lypynsky Street, Bohdan Khmelnytsky Street, and the Botanical Square, where the A.V. Fomin Botanical Garden as well as St Volodymyr's Cathedral are located.

== History ==
The street appeared in the second half of the 19th century, formed from two streets — Afanasiivska (between the modern Yaroslav's Wall Street and Bohdan Khmelnytsky Street) and Nestorivska (between the modern-day Bohdan Khmelnytsky Street and Taras Shevchenko Boulevard). Afanasiivska Street was first mentioned in 1855, and its name came from Afanasiivsky (Sviatoslavsky) Ravine, over which the street was built. The name Nestorivska (Ukrainian: Несторівська; Russian: Несторовская, romanized: Nestorovskaya), in honour of Nestor "the Chronicler", was given to the street during the 1869 renaming of Kyiv's streets. However, in official documents dating back to the 1880s, the street was also referred to as Nesterovska(ya). In 1889, both streets were merged under the common name Nesterivska.

In 1926, in connection with the 10th anniversary of the death of the poet and writer Ivan Franko, the Nesterivska was renamed Ivan Franko Street. The current revised name is from 1944.

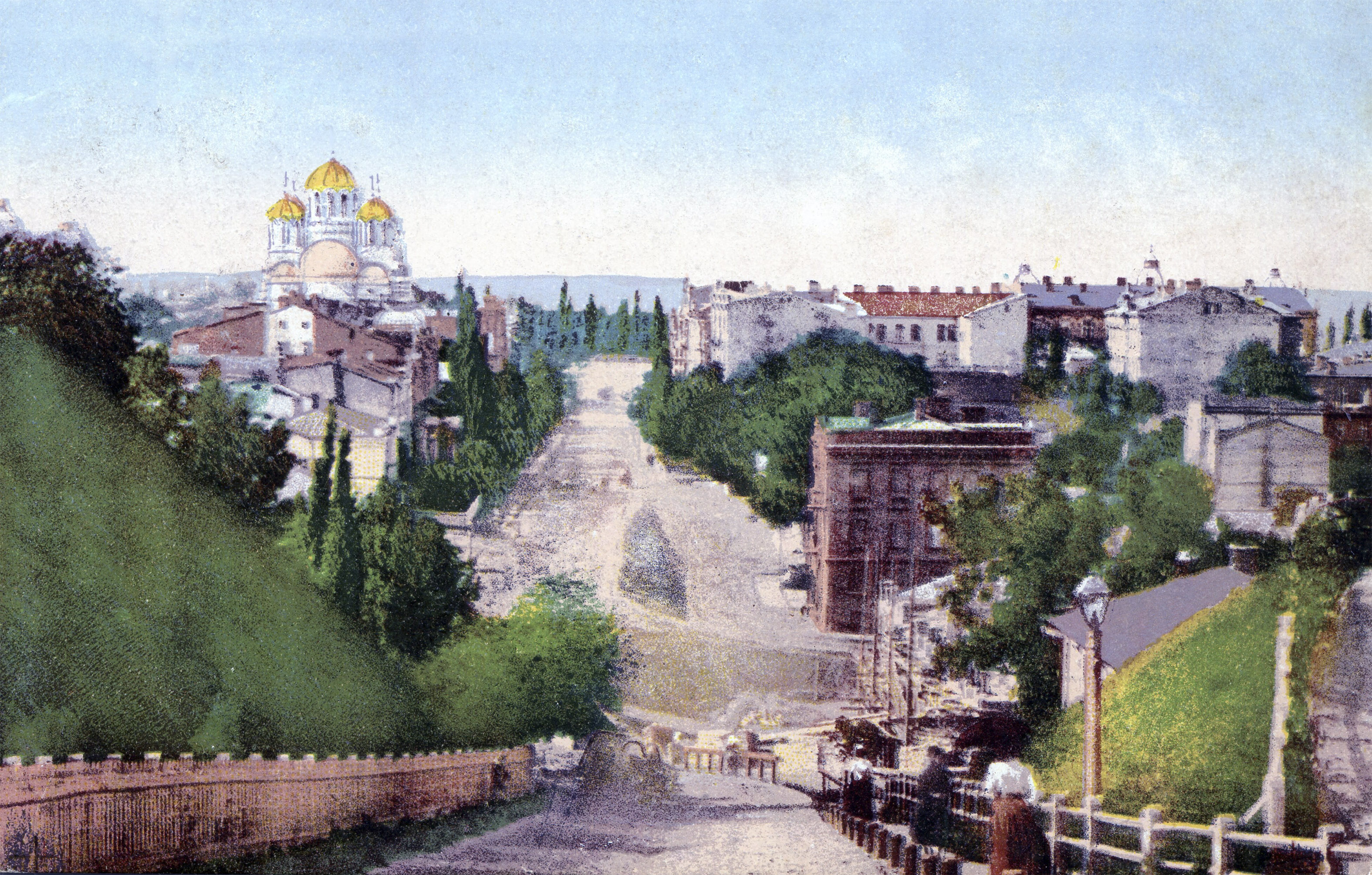
Nesterivska Street, 1890

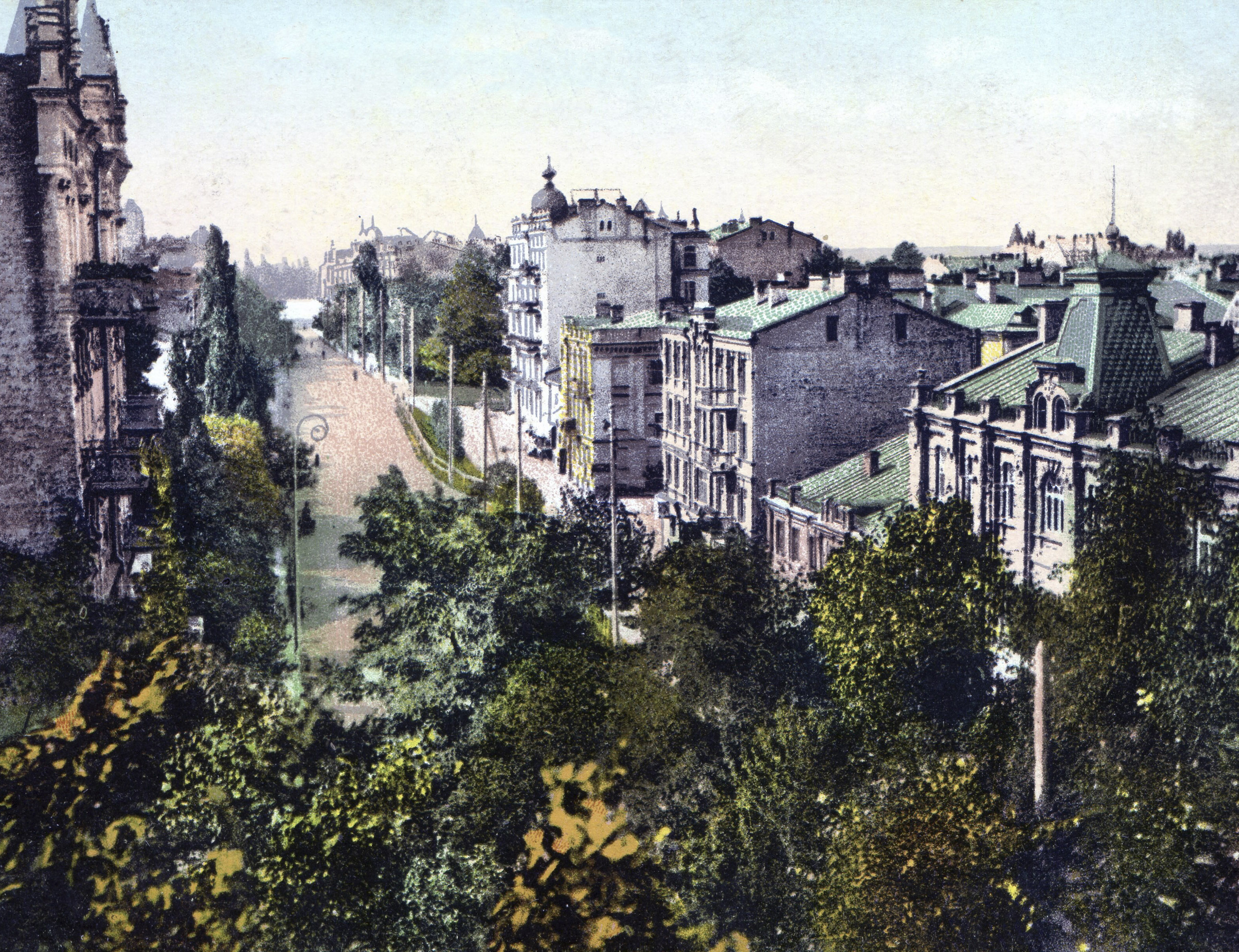
Nesterivska Street, 1902

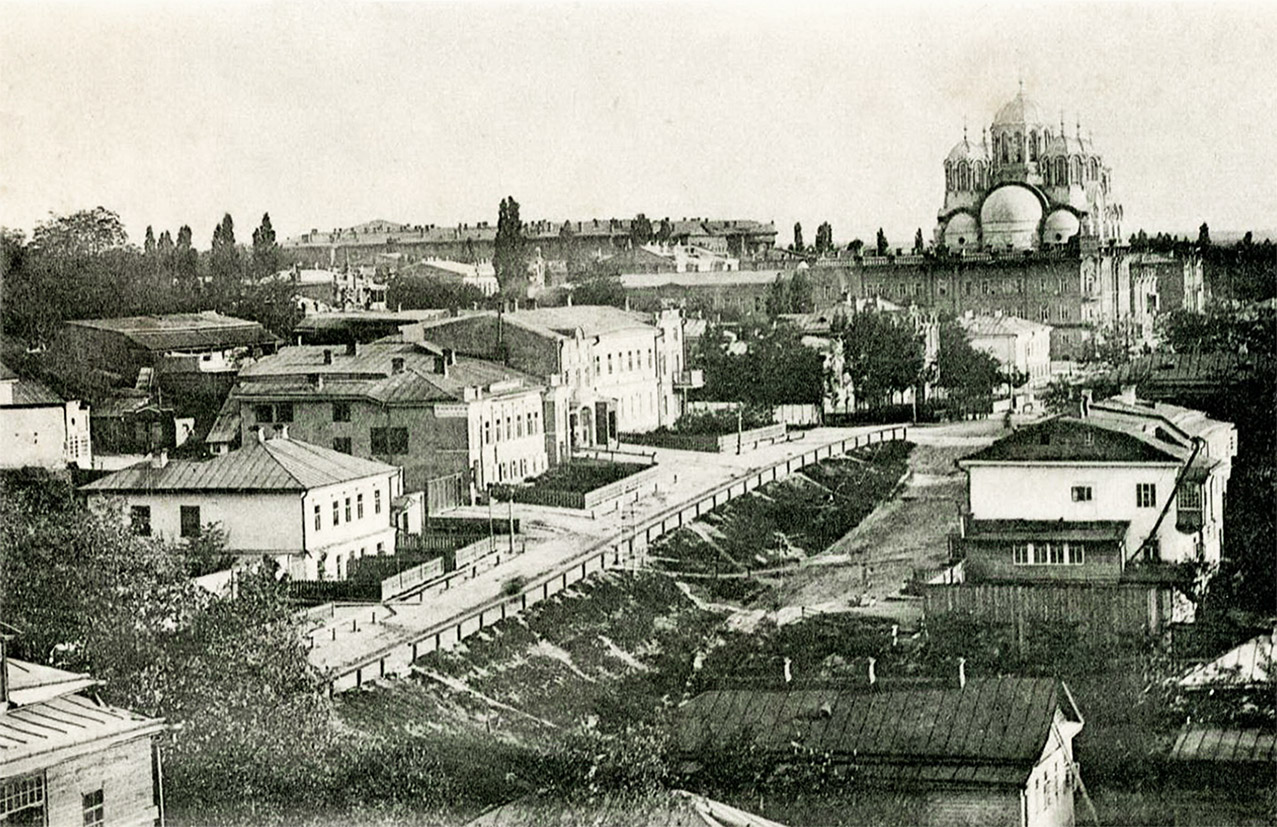
View of St Volodymyr's Cathedral, 1890

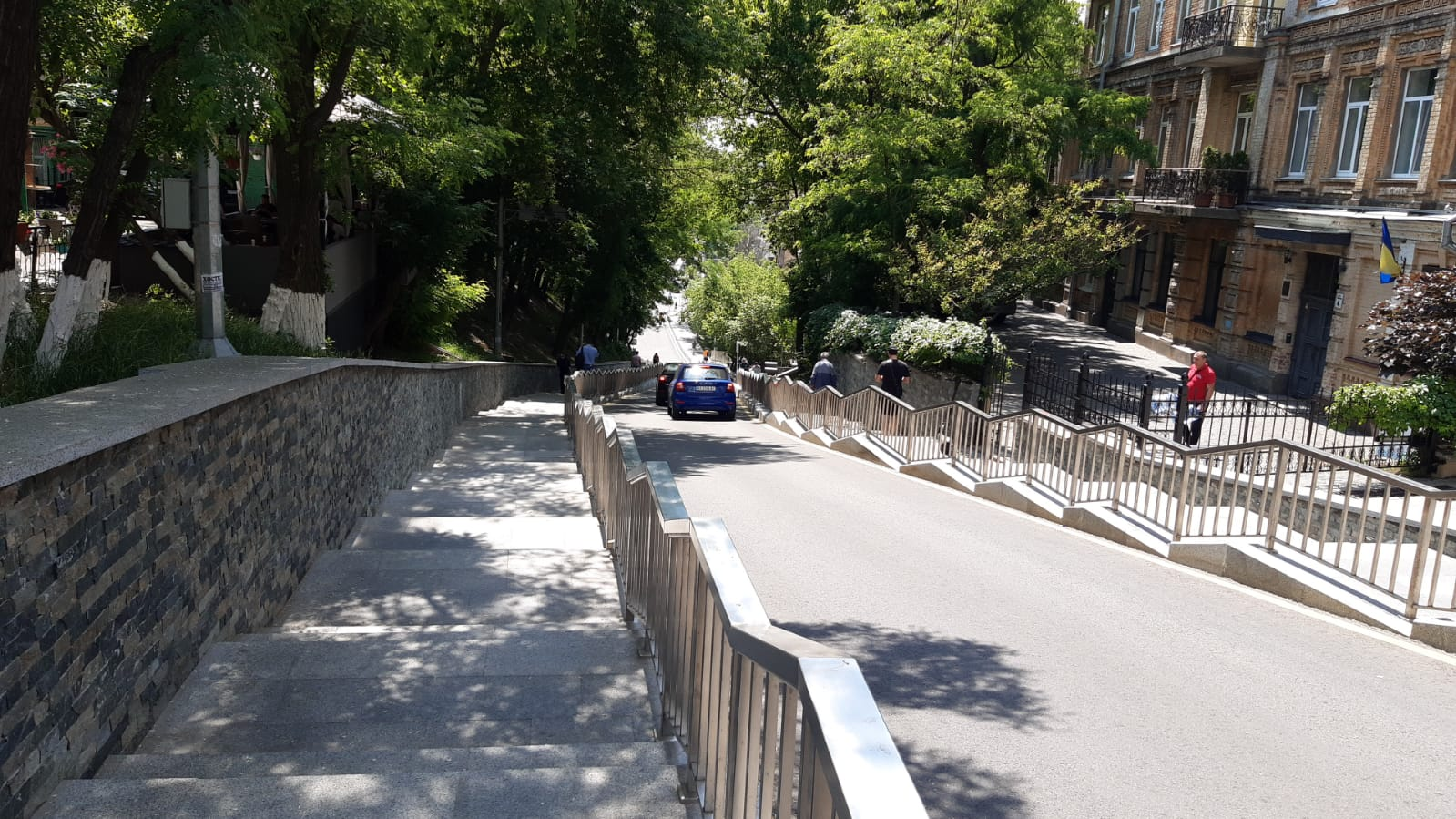
Descent from Yaroslav's Wall, 2023

== Buildings of historical and architectural value, architectural monuments ==
- No. 4. Mansion; 1897, architect Andriy-Ferdinand Krauss;
- No. 19. Apartment building; late nineteenth - early twentieth century;
- No. 28. Mansion; late nineteenth century;
- No. 42. Residential building.

Houses No. 1, 5, 6, 9, 11, 12, 13, 15, 16, 17, 18, 20, 22, 26 (‘Zamkov's house’), 29, 31, 33, 34, 36, 38, 40, 42, 44, 46 were built in the 2nd half of the 19th century - 1st third of the 20th century.

== Personalities ==
House No. 4 belonged to the sister of the famous scientist Mykola Kashchenko and writer Adrian Kashchenko. In 1904–1913, the composer Bohumil Voyachek lived in house No. 18. In the early twentieth century, Otto Schmidt lived in house No. 26. Academician Volodymyr Ikonnikov lived in house No. 31. In house No. 33 lived the bridge engineer Mykola Beleliubskyi and in 1918–1919 - the writer Konstantin Paustovsky.

In 1880–1882, the building on the territory of the present-day estate No. 19 housed the drawing school of Mykola Murashko.

== Institutions and establishments ==
- No. 19 - Ministry of Culture of Ukraine
- No. 33 - Embassy of Austria in Ukraine
- No. 34 - Embassy of Sweden in Ukraine

== Gallery ==
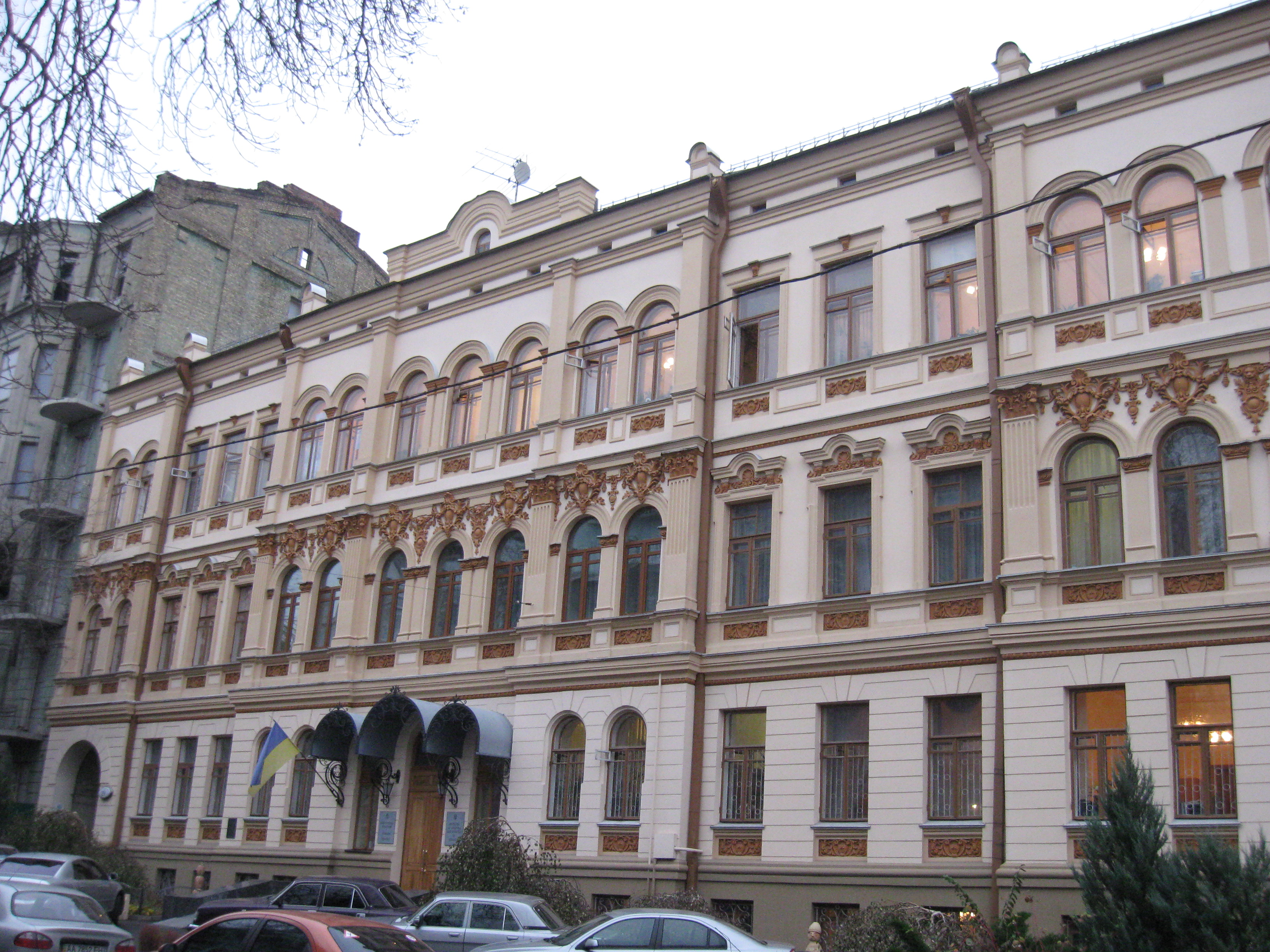
Ministry of Culture of Ukraine building

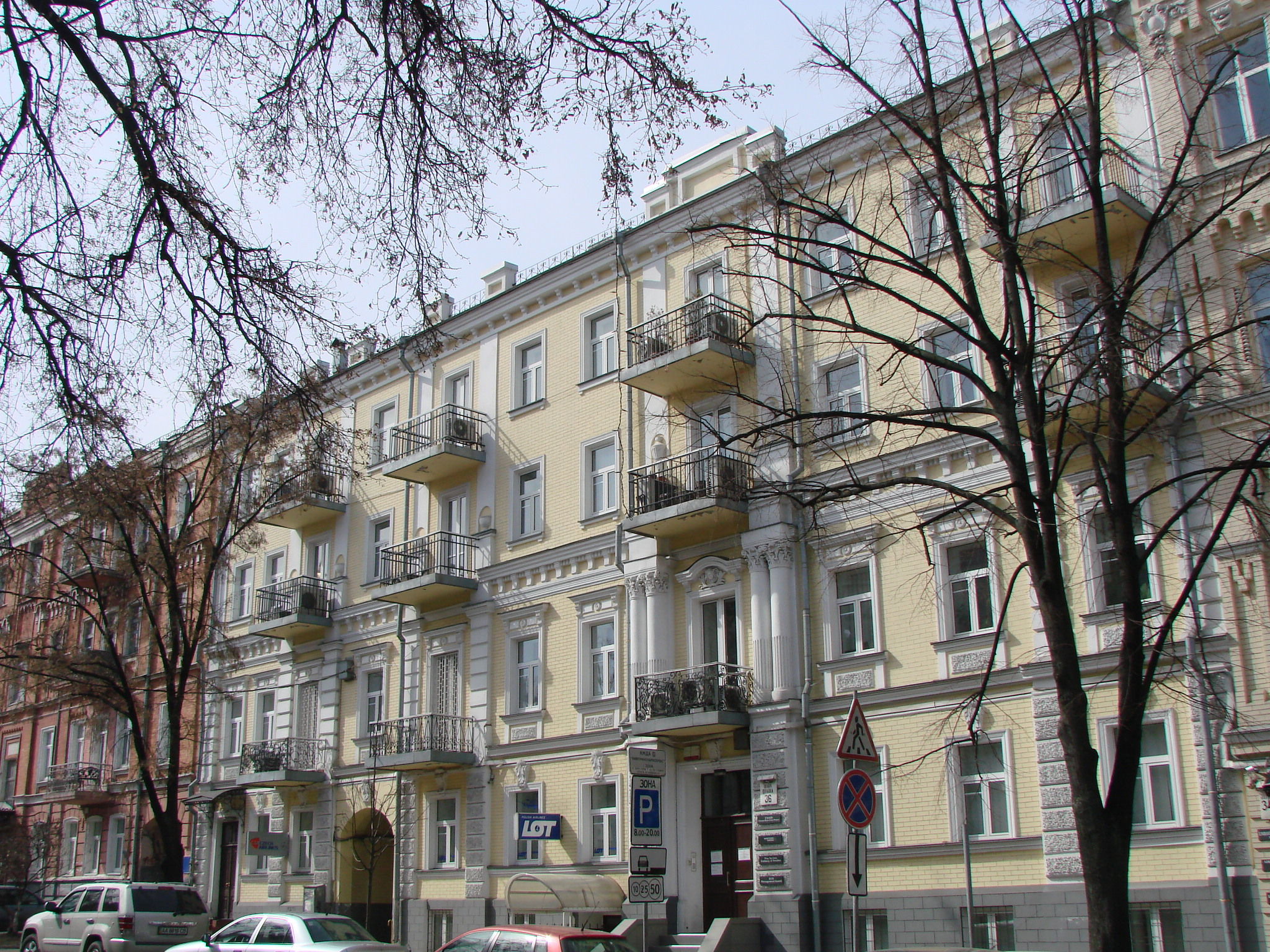
House No. 36

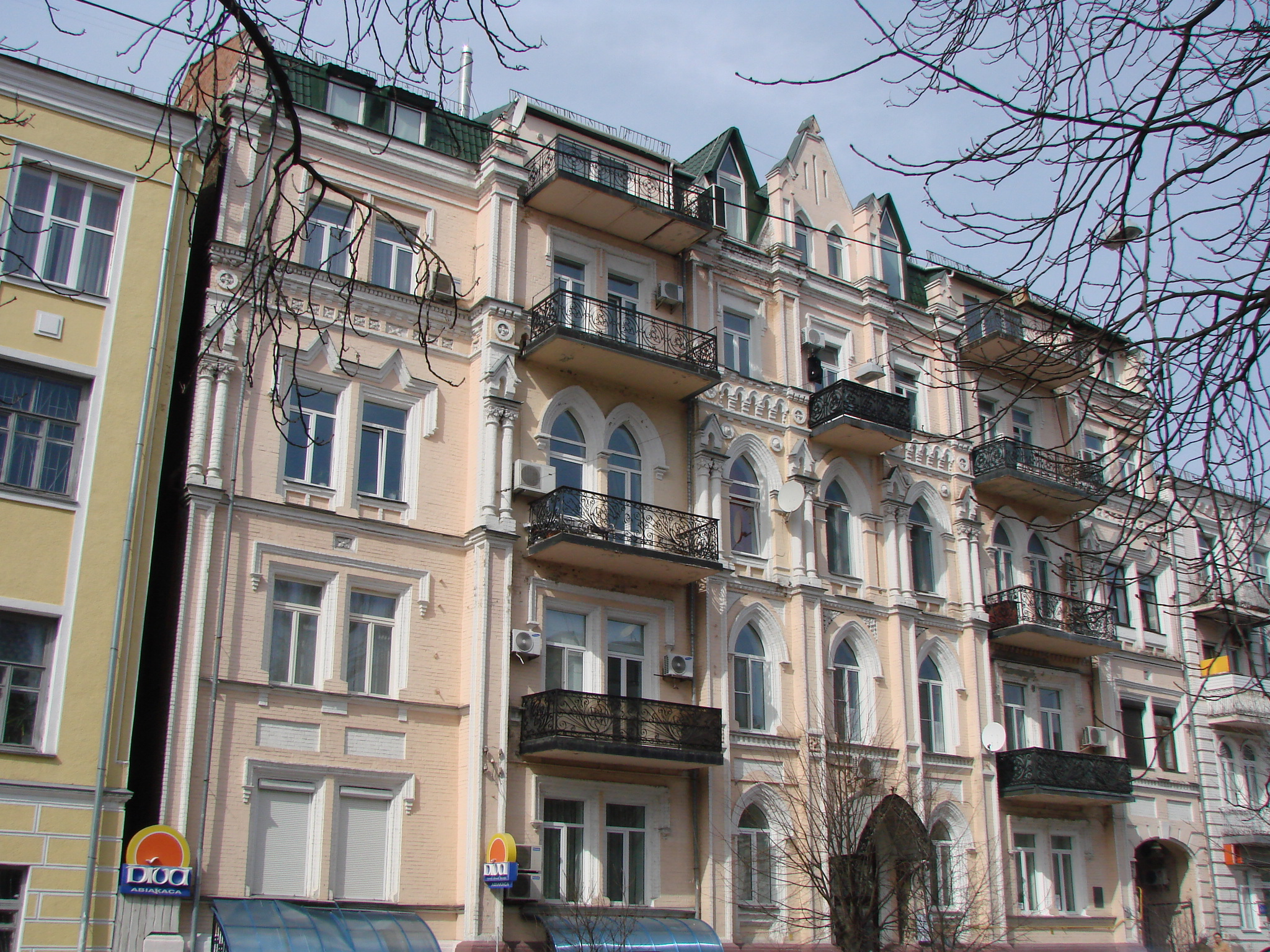
House No. 42

== Sources ==
- Web encyclopedia of Kyiv.
- Streets of Kyiv: a handbook. Compiled by A. M. Syhalov and others. Kyiv: Reklama [Advertising], 1975. p. 95.
- Kudrytskyi, Anatolii Viktorovych; Ponomarenko, Lidiya Antonivna; Riznyk, Oleksandr (1995). Вулиці Києва. Довідник [Streets of Kyiv: a handbook] (in Ukrainian). Kyiv: Ukrainska Entsyklopediia Imeni M.P. Bazhana. p. 236. ISBN 5-88500-070-0.
- Ivana Franka Street // Streets of Kyiv: Official Handbook. Appendix to the decision of the Kyiv City Council dated 22 January 2015 No. 34/899 “On approval of the official handbook “Streets of Kyiv City””. p. 287.
- "Galayba photo memory: Ivana Franka Vulytsia".
- Ivan Franko Street // Kyiv: An Encyclopedic Handbook (1982) / ed. A. V. Kudrytsky. Kyiv. : See ed. Ukrainian Soviet Encyclopedia, 1982. p. 610. (Russian)
- Ivana Franka Street // MIAS ZMD "Urban Planning Cadastre of Kyiv".
- Старий Київ. Вулиця Івана Франка, Афанасіївський яр on YouTube
