= Encyclopedic Dictionary of Astronomy =

The Encyclopedic Dictionary of Astronomy (Ukrainian: Астрономічний енциклопедичний словник) is a Ukrainian encyclopedia of astronomy. It was published in 2003 and has around 3000 entries.

== See also ==
- List of astronomical observatories in Ukraine
- List of Ukrainian encyclopedias
- Science and technology in Ukraine
