= Protsenko =

Protsenko (Ukrainian: Проценко) is the name of:

- Andriy Protsenko (born 1988), Ukrainian high jumper
- Borys Protsenko (born 1978), Ukrainian ice hockey player
- Karolina Protsenko (born 2008), US-based Ukrainian violinist
- Liudmyla Protsenko (1927–2000), Ukrainian historian
- Maria Protsenko (born 1946), Soviet architect
- Oleg Protsenko (born 1963), Russian triple jumper
- Vyacheslav Protsenko (born 1974), Ukrainian football player and coach
