= List of encyclopedias in Ukrainian =

This is a list of encyclopedias in the Ukrainian language.

Printed (paper)
Digital (online)
Both*

*This usually means that volumes of the encyclopaedia were originally printed on paper, but at some point (usually in the 1990s or early 2000s), the encyclopaedia has been digitised and made available in whole or in part in electronic form (usually online, but not necessarily). New entries may or may not be added, while old entries (originally printed) may or may not be updated. Usually, publication of paper-printed editions has been discontinued.

Title in English	Title in Ukrainian (Note: In the Ukrainian Cyrillic alphabet, and the Ukrainian Latin alphabet according to DSTU 9112:2021 transliteration system B.)	Published
Artists of Ukraine: An Encyclopedic Handbook	Митці України: енциклопедичний довідник, Mytsi Ukrajiny: entsyklopedychnyj dovidnyk	1992
Chernihiv Region: An Encyclopedic Handbook	Чернігівщина: Енциклопедичний довідник, Chernighivshchyna: Entsyklopedychnyj dovidnyk	1990
City and people. Yelysavethrad – Kirovohrad, 1754–2004. Illustrated Encyclopedia	Місто і люди. Єлисаветград — Кіровоград, 1754—2004. Ілюстрована енциклопедія Misto i ljudy. Jelysavetghrad — Kirovoghrad, 1754–2004. Iljustrovana entsyklopedija	2004
Ecological Encyclopedia	Екологічна енциклопедія, Ekolohichna entsyklopedija	2007–2008
Economic Encyclopedia	Економічна енциклопедія, Ekonomichna entsyklopedija	2000–2002
Encyclopedic Dictionary of Astronomy	Астрономічний енциклопедичний словник, Astronomichnyj entsyclopedychnyj slovnyk	2003
Encyclopedic Dictionary of Philosophy	Філософський енциклопедичний словник, Filosofsjkyj entsyklopedychnyj slovnyk	1973, 1986
Encyclopedia of the Kolomyia Region	Енциклопедія Коломийщини, Entsyklopedija Kolomyjshchyny	1996–
Encyclopedia of Cybernetics	Енциклопедія кібернетики, Entsyklopedija kibernetyky	1973
Encyclopedia of Education	Енциклопедія освіти, Entsyklopedija osvity	2008
Encyclopaedia of Modern Ukraine	Енциклопедія Сучасної України, Entsyklopedija Suchasnoji Ukrajiny	2001–present (print); 2014–present (online)
Encyclopedia of Ukrainian Studies: 1963, 1970 English translation (2 volumes): Ukraine: A Concise Encyclopaedia; 1984–1993 English translation (5 volumes): Encyclopedia of Ukraine; 2001–present English translation (online): Internet Encyclopedia of Ukraine (IEU)	Енциклопедія українознавства, Entsyklopedija ukrajinoznavstva	1949–1995; 1993–2003
Encyclopedia of History of Ukraine	Енциклопедія історії України (ЕІУ), Entsyklopedija istoriji Ukrajiny (EIU)	2003–2013; 2019
Encyclopedia of the Ukrainіan Diaspora	Енциклопедія української діяспори, Entsyklopedija Ukrajinsjkoji dijaspory	1995–present
Ukrainian Encyclopedia of Jazz	Українська енциклопедія джазу, Ukrajinsjka entsyklopedija dzhazu	2004
Encyclopedia of Lviv	Енциклопедія Львова, Entsyklopedija Ljvova	2007–2012 (Note: Published in four volumes (2007, 2008, 2010, 2012), digitised on Archive.org.)
Encyclopedia of Literature Studies	Літературознавча енциклопедія, Literaturoznavcha entsyklopedija	2007
Encyclopedia of Psychology	Психологічна енциклопедія, Psykholohija entsyklopedija	2006
Geographical Encyclopedia of Ukraine	Географічна енциклопедія України, Gheoghrafichna entsyklopedija Ukrayiny	1989–1993
Great Ukrainian Encyclopedia	Велика українська енциклопедія, Velyka ukrajinsjka entsyklopedija	2016–present
Handbook on the history of Ukraine	Довідник з історії України, Dovidnyk z istoriji Ukrajiny	1993–1999
History of Cities and Villages in Ukrainian SSR	Історія міст і сіл Української РСР, Istorija mist i sil Ukrajinsjkoji RSR	1962
Izbornyk	Ізборник, Izbornyk	2001–present
Kyiv: An Encyclopedic Handbook	Київ: енциклопедичний довідник, Kyjiv: entsyklopedychnyj dovidnyk	1981–1986 (Note: Original edition in Ukrainian published in 1981. Translated editions in Russian published in 1982, 1985–1986, and 1986.)
Legal Encyclopedia	Юридична енциклопедія, Jurydychna entsyklopedija	1998–2004
Medieval Castles of Europe (book): An Illustrated Encyclopedia	Середньовічні замки Європи: Ілюстрована енциклопедія Serednjovichni zamky Jevropy: Iljustrovana entsyklopedija	2010
Mining Encyclopedia	Гірнича енциклопедія, Ghirnycha entsyklopedija	1980–1984
Mining Encyclopedic Dictionary	Гірничий енциклопедичний словник, Ghirnychyj entsyklopedychnyj slovnyk	2001–2004
Pharmaceutical Encyclopedia	Фармацевтична енциклопедія, Farmacevtychna entsyklopedija	2010–present
Poltava Region: An Encyclopedic Handbook	Полтавщина: енциклопедичний довідник, Poltavshchyna: entsyklopedychnyj dovidnyk	1992
Shevchenko Encyclopedia	Шевченківська енциклопедія, Shevchenkivsjka entsyklopedija	2012–2015
Shevchenko Dictionary	Шевченківський словник, Shevchenkivsjkyj slovnyk	1976–1977
Small Mining Encyclopedia	Мала гірнича енциклопедія, Mala ghirnycha entsyklopedija	2004
Soviet Encyclopedia of the History of Ukraine	Радянська енциклопедія історії України, Radjansjka entsyklopedija istoriji Ukrajiny	1969–1972
Streets of Kyiv: a handbook	Вулиці Києва: довідник, Vulytsi Kyeva: dovidnyk	1958–2015
Ternopil Encyclopedic Dictionary	Тернопільський енциклопедичний словник, Ternopiljsjkyj entsyklopedychnyj slovnyk	2004–2010
The Ukrainian People in its Past and Present (1st Ukrainian encyclopedia, edited by Hrushevsky)	Український народ в його минулому та теперішньому Ukrajinsjkyj narod v joho mynulomu ta teperishnjomu (Note: Original pre-1918 reform Russian title: Украинскій народъ въ его прошломъ и настоящемъ, Ukrainskij narod' v' ego proshlom' i nastojashchem'.)	1914–1916
Ukrainian Wikipedia	Українська Вікіпедія, Ukrajinsjka Vikipedija	2004–present
Ukrainian Small Encyclopedia	Українська мала енциклопедія, Ukrajinsjka mala entsyklopedija	1957–1967
Ukrainian General Encyclopedia	Українська загальна енциклопедія, Ukrajinsjka zaghaljna entsyklopedija	1930–1935
Ukrainian Literary Encyclopedia	Українська літературна енциклопедія, Ukrajinsjka literaturna entsyklopedija	1988
Ukrainian Soviet Encyclopedia: 1st ed. English translation: 1969; 1st ed. Russian translation: 1969; 2nd ed. Russian translation: 1978–?	Українська радянська енциклопедія, Ukrajinsjka radjansjka entsyklopedija	1959–1965; 1974–1985
Ukrainian Soviet Encyclopedic Dictionary	Український радянський енциклопедичний словник Ukrajinsjkij radjanskyj entsyklopedychnyj slovnyk	1966–1968; 1986–1987
Universal Dictionary-Encyclopedia	Універсальний словник-енциклопедія, Universaljniy slovnyk-entsyklopedija	1999–2006
The Ukrainian Language: An Encyclopedia	Українська мова: енциклопедія, Ukrajinsjka mova: entsyklopedija	2000–present
Women of Ukraine (book): A Biographical Encyclopedic Dictionary	Жінки України: Біографічний енциклопедичний словник Zhinky Ukrajiny: Bioghrafichnyj entsyklopedychnyj slovnyk	2001

== See also ==
- State Research Institution "Encyclopedia Press"
