= Kyiv: An Encyclopedic Handbook =

1981 encyclopaedia about Kyiv, Ukraine

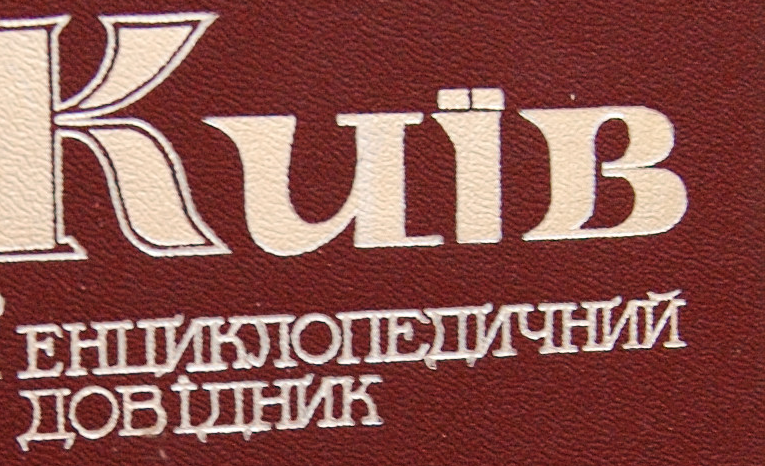
- 1981 Ukrainian edition
- Original title: Київ: енциклопедичний довідник
- Language: Ukrainian (1981); Russian (1982, 1985–1986)
- Subject: geography and history of Kyiv
- Genre: encyclopedia
- Publisher: Main editorial board of the Ukrainian Soviet Encyclopedia
- Publication place: Ukrainian SSR
- Media type: printed

Kyiv: An Encyclopedic Handbook or Kyiv: Encyclopedic Reference Book (Ukrainian: Київ: енциклопедичний довідник, romanized: Kyjiv: entsyklopedychnyj dovidnyk; Russian: Киев: энциклопедический справочник, romanized: Kiev: entsiklopedicheskij spravochnik) is the first universal encyclopaedic reference book about Kyiv published by the Main Editorial Board of the Ukrainian Soviet Encyclopedia, under the lead editorship of Anatoliy Kudritskiy. It was published in 1981 in Ukrainian. A Russian translation was first published in 1982. The second Russian edition came out in 1985 and 1986, and the third Russian edition in 1986. The book was prepared for the celebration of the so-called 1500th anniversary of Kiev in 1982.

== Contents ==
The reference book opens with an introductory essay providing general information about the history, nature, economy and culture of Kyiv. The main part of the book contains over 2,500 alphabetically arranged articles providing information about the most important historical events, revolutionary, military and labour traditions of the working people of Kyiv, the historical and administrative districts of the city, its residential areas, largest enterprises, main and oldest streets and squares, educational and research institutions, artistic and cultural institutions, press, creative unions, mass societies and organisations, monuments and historical and architectural landmarks, memorial plaques, and so on.

The content of the book is supplemented by a chronological table of major events in the history of Kyiv (from 25,000 years ago until 1981) mentioned in the reference book. In addition, there is a list of abbreviations.

The Ukrainian edition contained 190 illustrations on colour and black-and-white inserts, and over 290 illustrations within the text. The Russian editions contained 212 illustrations on inserts and over 340 within the text.

A significant part of the reference book's materials are original and published for the first time. In working on the book, use was made of the collections of Kyivan archives, museums, libraries, historical literature, periodicals, as well as articles (in the relevant edition) published in the 1st and 2nd editions of the Ukrainian Soviet Encyclopedia (URE), in the Soviet Encyclopedia of the History of Ukraine, and in other main editions of the URE. The directory was published against the backdrop of rapidly changing events in the city and throughout the country. As a result, changes and additions were made to its various editions, each of which was printed in stages. In addition, readers submitted substantiated reports of some errors and inaccuracies to the editorial office, which were corrected without changing the layout whenever possible.

According to the Slavic Review (1982), "The book omits a number of persons (Ivan Mazepa, Mykhailo Hrushevs'kyi, and others) who contributed to the cultural development of the city (...)." The reviewer also noted the absence of "the official periodical publications issued by the governments of the Ukrainian National Republic in the years 1917–1919."

== Editions ==
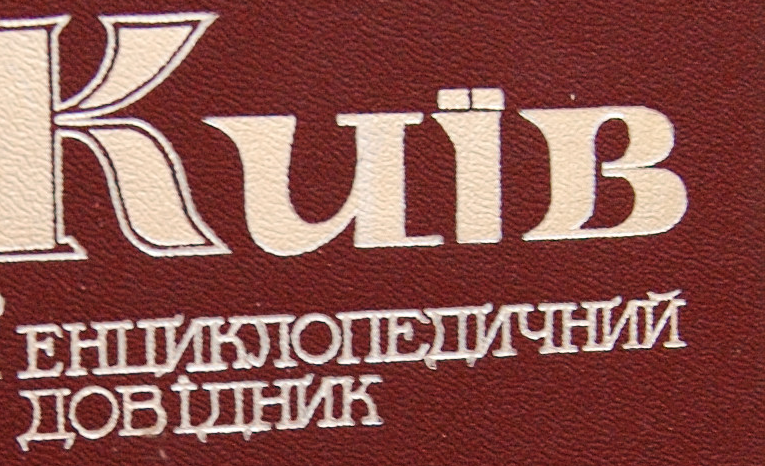
1981 Ukrainian edition

In general, the following editions can be distinguished:

=== Ukrainian edition ===
- single-column layout, 736 pages, circulation 100,000 copies, format 75×90^{1}/_{32}.
- 1st edition (1–50,000), Bordeaux red cover,
- 2nd edition (50,001–100,000), burgundy cover. The last page contains a message to readers about the most urgent changes that occurred after the book was signed for printing. The first endpaper contains a plan-scheme of historical and historical-revolutionary monuments and memorial sites of the city, and the last one contains a scheme of the location of scientific and cultural institutions.

=== First edition in Russian (1982) ===
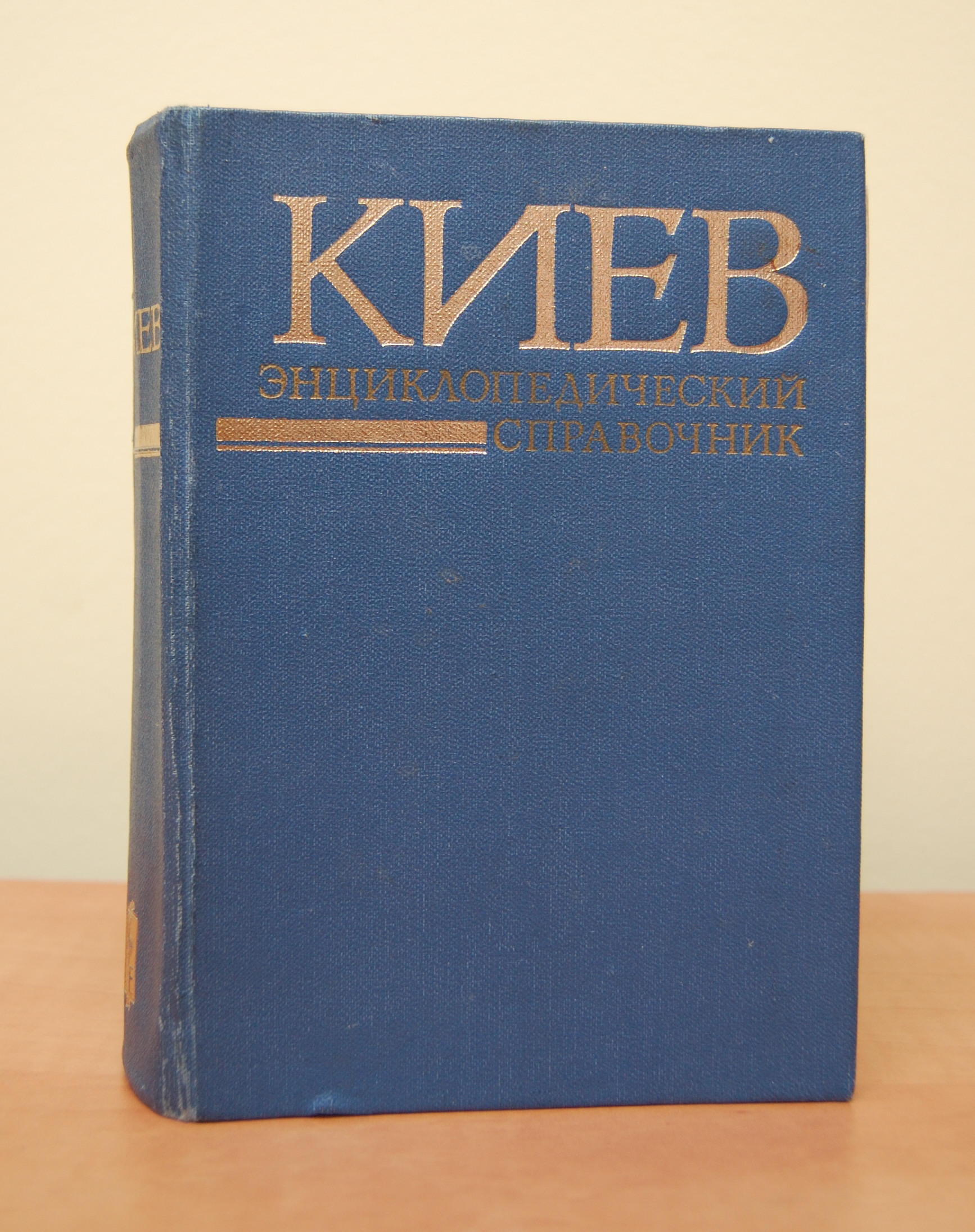
1982 first Russian edition

- two-column layout, 704 pages, 100,000 copies, 70×1001/32 format.
- 1st printing (1-25,000), white cover.
- The 2nd printing run (25,001-100,000), the cover is dark blue.
- The title page bears the logo 'Kiev 1500 years'.

=== Second edition in Russian (1985–1986) ===
- two-column layout, 7760 pages, circulation 140,000 copies, format 70×100^{1}/_{32}.
- 1st edition (1–55,000), 1985, green cover. The number of articles has been increased to more than 3,000, corrections have been made.
- 2nd edition (55,001–100,000), 1985, Bordeaux red cover.
- 3rd edition (100,001–140,000), 1986, green cover.

=== Third edition in Russian (1986) ===
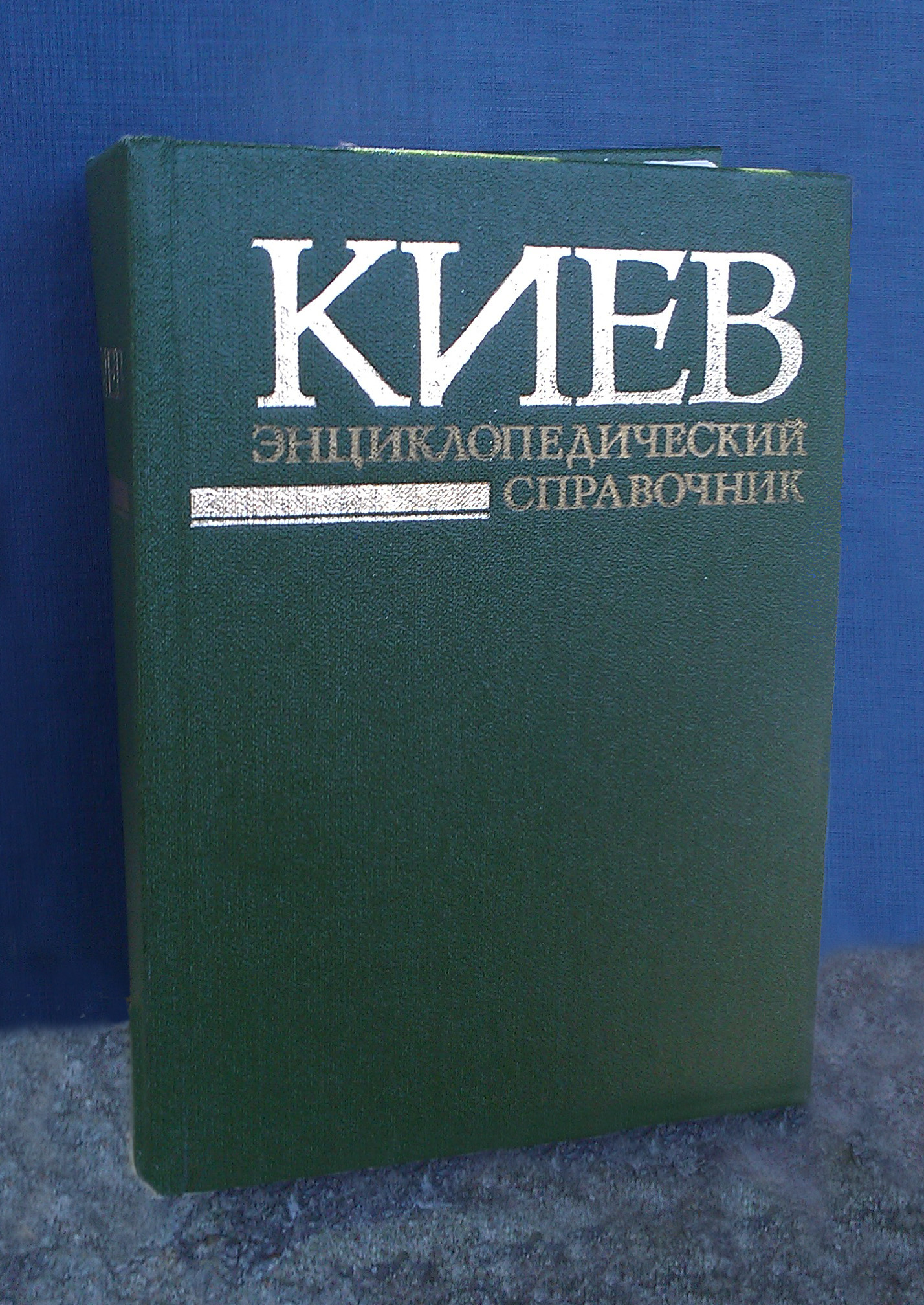
1986 third Russian edition

- two-column layout, 768 pages, circulation 90,000 copies, format 70×100^{1}/_{32}.
- Brown cover. Corrections made, 32 articles added in the "Supplement" after the main block.

== Editorial staff ==
The editorial staff was composed of dozens of historians, archaeologists, architects, art historians, specialists in other fields of knowledge, managers and senior employees of many Kyiv institutions and enterprises, and employees of the Main Editorial Office of the Ukrainian Soviet Encyclopedia. For the first edition in Ukrainian, scientific advisors included Yuriy Kondufor, Mykola Kotljar, Ivan Kuras, and Petro Tolochko. Authors of individual articles included Mykola Szczerbak, Tamara Bulat, Petro Tolochko, Hlib Ivakin, Lidiya Ponomarenko, and Liudmyla Protsenko. Employees of the Main Editorial Office of the URE who participated in the preparation of the reference book included Larysa Briukhovetska.

== See also ==
- List of encyclopedias in Ukrainian
- Streets of Kyiv: a handbook

== Sources ==
- Shtohryn, Dmytro (1982). "Reference Books of 1980-81: A Selection: Kyiv; Entsyklopedychnyi dovidnyk [review]". Slavic Review. 41 (3). Association for Slavic, East European, and Eurasian Studies: 590–596. doi:10.1017/S0037677900064433. ISSN 0037-6779. JSTOR 2497074.
- Київ: енциклопедичний довідник [Kyiv: An Encyclopedic Handbook] / edited by A. V. Kudrytsky . — Kyiv : Main editor of the Ukrainian Soviet Encyclopedia, 1981. — 736 p., ill. (Ukrainian)
- Киев: энциклопедический справочник [Kiev: An Encyclopedic Handbook] / editor. AND. IN. Kudrytsky — K. : See ed. Ukrainian Soviet Encyclopedia, 1982. — 704 p., illustrations. (Russian)
- Киев: энциклопедический справочник [Kiev: An Encyclopedic Handbook] / editor. AND. IN. Kudrytskyi - 2nd ed. — K. : See ed. Ukrainian Soviet Encyclopedia, 1985. — 760 p., illustrations. (Russian)
- Киев: энциклопедический справочник [Kiev: An Encyclopedic Handbook] / editor. AND. IN. Kudrytskyi . — 3rd ed., add. — K. : See ed. Ukrainian Soviet Encyclopaedia, 1986. — 768 pp., illustrations. (Russian)
