= List of astronomical observatories in Ukraine =

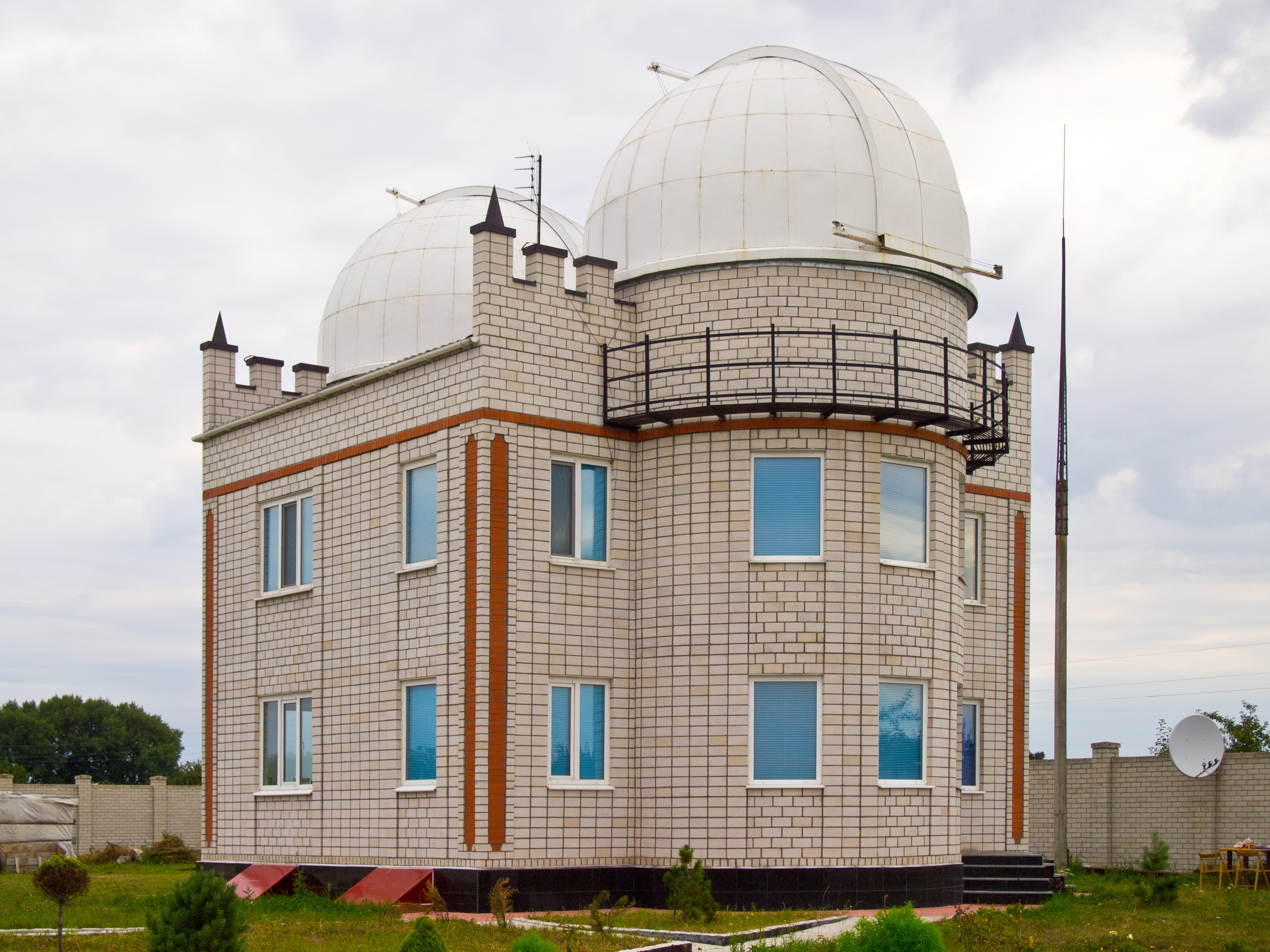
The Andrushivka Astronomical Observatory is one of several observatories in Ukraine. It was established in 2001.

This is a list of astronomical observatories in Ukraine:

- Andrushivka Astronomical Observatory
- Crimean Astrophysical Observatory
- Mykolaiv Astronomical Observatory
- Simeiz Observatory
- White Elephant

== Radio telescopes ==
- Giant Ukrainian Radio Telescope
- Ukrainian T-shaped Radio telescope, second modification
