= Streets of Kyiv: a handbook =

Book about streets in Kyiv

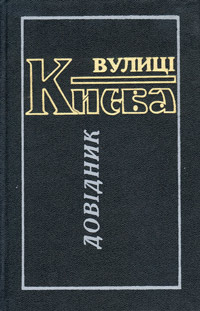
- 1995 edition cover, designed by Vasyl Danylchuk
- Editors: Anatoliy Kudritskyi, Lidiya Ponomarenko and Oleksandr Riznyk
- Original title: Вулиці Києва: довідник
- Language: Ukrainian
- Subject: geography and history of Kyiv
- Genre: handbook
- Publisher: Publishing house ‘Ukrainian Encyclopaedia’ named after M. P. Bazhan
- Publication place: Ukraine
- Media type: hardcover
- Pages: 352
- ISBN: 5-88500-070-0

Streets of Kyiv: a handbook (Ukrainian: Вулиці Києва: довідник, romanized: Vulytsi Kyeva: dovidnyk) is a handbook about the streets, lanes and squares of Kyiv. It was published by the publishing house ‘Ukrainian Encyclopaedia’ named after M. P. Bazhan in 1995. It contains around 2,000 articles.

The editors of the handbook are Anatoliy Kudritskyi, Lidiya Ponomarenko and Oleksandr Riznyk.

== Contents ==
The articles provide information on the end points of the streets, the streets that connect to the main feature, the dates on which the streets were established, any renamings, a brief historical background, as well as information about the person after whom a street, lane or square is named. It lists not only the districts in which the streets are located, but also housing estates, historic neighbourhoods and so on. The articles list metro stations, high-speed tram stops and suburban railway stations that are directly connected to a particular street or from which it is possible to reach other streets. The book contains maps of the city’s underground, tram and trolleybus routes, as well as a glossary of place names for its historic neighbourhoods and a list of streets and squares that disappeared between the 1970s and 1990s.

== Editions ==
This handbook was not the first of its kind — previous editions of the Streets of Kyiv: a handbook were published in 1958, 1975 and 1979. Compared with previous editions, the 1995 edition contains the most comprehensive historical information about the city’s streets, lanes, squares and avenues (previous editions did not include historical details for each street). In 2010, there were plans to reprint the handbook.

- Streets of Kyiv: a handbook. Edited by O. I. Marchuk et al. Kyiv: Державне видавництво технічної літератури [State Publishing House of Technical Literature], 1958.
- Streets of Kyiv: a handbook. Compiled by A. M. Syhalov and others. Kyiv: Reklama [Advertising], 1975.
- Streets of Kyiv: a handbook. Second, revised edition. Compiled by A. M. Syhalov and others. Kyiv: Reklama [Advertising], 1979.
- Kudrytskyi, Anatolii Viktorovych; Ponomarenko, Lidiya Antonivna; Riznyk, Oleksandr (1995). Вулиці Києва. Довідник [Streets of Kyiv: a handbook] (in Ukrainian). Kyiv: Ukrainska Entsyklopediia Imeni M.P. Bazhana. p. 352. ISBN 5-88500-070-0.
- Streets of Kyiv: Official Handbook. Appendix to the decision of the Kyiv City Council dated 22 January 2015 No. 34/899, “On approval of the official handbook Streets of Kyiv City”. 324 pp.

== See also ==
- Kyiv: An Encyclopedic Handbook
- List of encyclopedias in Ukrainian

== Sources ==
- www.knyha.com
