= Liudmyla Protsenko =

Ukrainian historian (1927–2000)

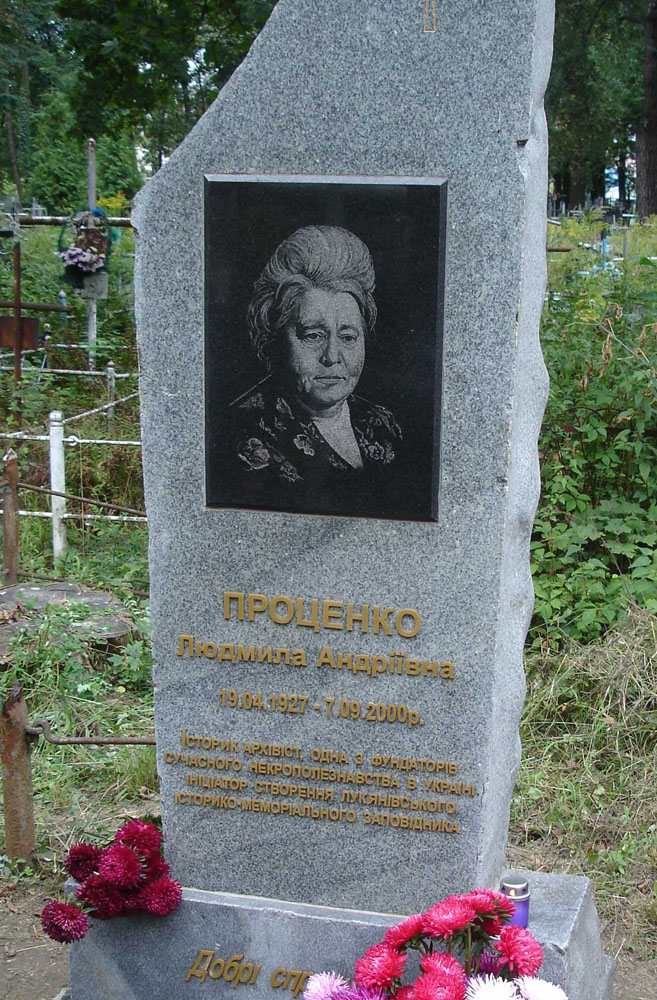

Liudmyla Andriivna Protsenko (Ukrainian: Людмила Андріївна Проценко; 19 April 1927 – 7 September 2000) was a Ukrainian historian, archivist, and local historian.

== Early life and education ==
Liudmyla Protsenko was born on 19 April 1927 in Kyiv. Her father, Andrii Fedorovych Protsenko, was a flutist and teacher. She received her higher education at the historical and archival department of the historical and philosophical faculty of Kyiv University (1951) and the Kyiv Conservatory (1954).

== Career ==
Protsenko was a head of the Department of Ancient Acts of the Central State Historical Archive of the Ukrainian SSR (1952–1967), and director of the Central State Archive-Museum of Literature and Art of the Ukrainian SSR (1967–1973). She made a huge contribution to the collection of archival funds, in particular, "unpopular" in the conditions of Soviet ideology, materials of devotees of Ukrainian culture, religious and repressed figures.

After Protsenko’s forced dismissal from the archive system in May 1973, she taught in Kyiv schools No. 1 and 38. Protsenko was active in public activities and was an activist for the Ukrainian Society for the Preservation of Historical and Cultural Monuments. She stood at the origins of a new research direction of historical science – necropolistics. Protsenko devoted more than three decades to the study of the historical necropolis of Kyiv, and created a unique index of personalities buried on Kyiv grounds from the time of Kyivan Rus until 1986. She headed the "Necropolis of Ukraine" section at the Main Council of Ukrainian Society for the Preservation of Historical and Cultural Monuments.

In 1994 Protsenko was an initiator of the creation of the State Historical and Memorial Lukyanivskyi Reserve on the territory of the Lukyanivske Civil Cemetery in Kyiv. She is considered the founder of this institution.

Liudmyla Protsenko died on 7 September 2000 in Kyiv. She was buried (according to the will) at the Lukyanivske Civil Cemetery next to her grandfather, the Ukrainian actor, singer, and choir conductor Kuzma Demidov (plot No. 30, row 9, place 8-2).

== Works ==
Protsenko has written more than 80 scientific works on the history and methods of archival work. She is a compiler of collections of archival documents, and maps Sights of Kyiv, destroyed in the 20th century. Protsenko is an author of numerous articles in scientific and popular periodicals, guidebooks Kyiv Necropolis (1993, dedicated to the burials of writers in Kyiv) and Lukyaniv Civil Cemetery (co-authored with Yurii Kostenko, 1998, second edition - 2001), monographs History of the Kyiv Necropolis (1995). In 2002, Protsenko’s guide to the necropolises in the Near and Far Caves of the Kyiv-Pechersk Lavra And to heaven with my hand was published posthumously.

== Commemoration ==
In 2016, a street in Kyiv was named in honor of Liudmyla Protsenko.
