= Lidiya Ponomarenko =

Ukrainian local historian (1922–2013)

Lydiya Ponomarenko
- Лідія Пономаренко
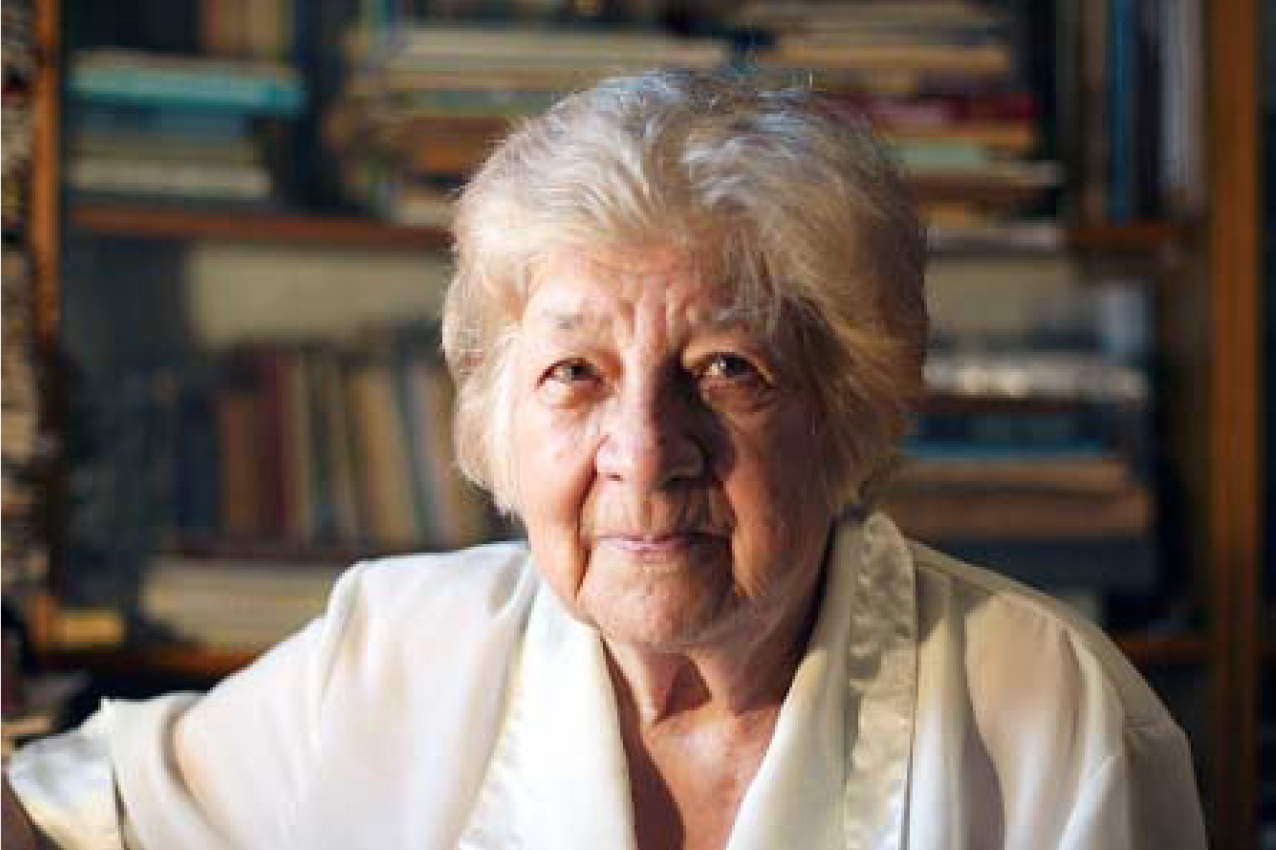
- Ponomarenko in 2012
- Born: 16 February 1922; Artemivsk, Ukrainian Socialist Soviet Republic (now Ukraine)
- Died: 3 December 2013 (aged 91); Kyiv, Ukraine
- Resting place: Northern Cemetery, Rozhny
- Citizenship: Soviet Union→Ukraine
- Education: Moscow State University of Geodesy and Cartography (1939-1946)
- Employer: Institute of History of Ukraine (1970-1982) Ukrainian Institute of Scientific and Technical Expertise and Information (d) (1967-1970) State Mine Supervision Committee of the Council of Ministers of the Ukrainian SSR (d) (1963-1967) Taras Shevchenko National University of Kyiv (1959-1960)
- Political party: Kabardino-Balkarian Regional Committee of the Communist Party of the Soviet Union (1951-1991)
- Father: Anton Ilarionovych Ponomarenko

Signature
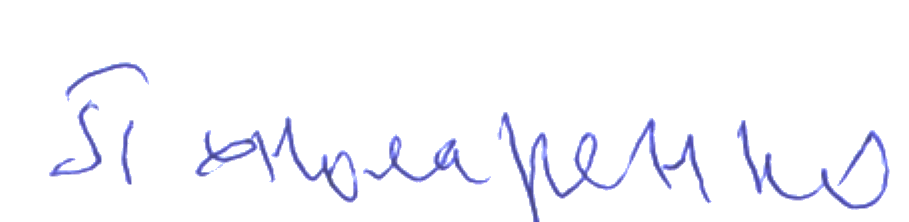

Lidiya Antonivna Ponomarenko (Ukrainian: Лідія Антонівна Пономаренко; 16 February 1922 – 3 December 2013) was a Ukrainian local historian. A researcher of historical topography and urban toponymy in Kyiv, she was co-author of an encyclopedic directory of Kyiv street names.

== Biography ==
Lydia Antonivna Ponomarenko was born in the family of a miner at the Artyom mine. Ponomarenko graduated from a secondary school in Krasnodon in 1939 and graduated from the Moscow Institute of Engineers of Geodesy, Aerial Photography and Cartography (aerial photography geodetic engineer) in 1949. Ponomarenko worked in her specialty in Novoshakhtinsk, Kadiivka.

She has lived and worked in Kyiv since 1959. As an employee of the laboratory of aerial methods of Kyiv University, Ponomarenko served in various institutions, dealing with geodesy and topography. In 1967-1970 when she was a researcher at the Institute of Scientific and Technical Information.

Since 1970, Ponomarenko has been professionally engaged in historical topography and cartography. Senior engineer-cartographer of the Institute of History of Ukraine at the Academy of Sciences of the Ukrainian SSR (1970–1982). She studied numerous plans and descriptions of Ukrainian cities of different eras, primarily Kyiv; among the materials considered by her, many were discovered and introduced into scientific circulation for the first time. Found in Leningrad a manuscript of the book "History of the City of Kyiv..." by Maxim Berlinsky, which was considered lost (now published).

Starting from the 1960s, Ponomarenko studied the toponymy of Kyiv, compiled an extensive card index on the history of city names. A number of finds were published by her in scientific publications and periodicals (over 300 publications in total, including in the newspapers Evening Kyiv, Khreshchatyk, and Janus-Nerukhomist). She handed over the materials of the card index and her works to Vernadsky National Library of Ukraine.

Participant of many scientific conferences. In the press, on radio and television programs, she actively advocated the preservation of historical toponymy, in defense of the cultural heritage of Kyiv and Ukraine; member of the Main Council of the Ukrainian Society for the Protection of Historical and Cultural Monuments. For a long time she headed the Kyiv section of monuments of science and technology; collaborated with the Center for Monument Studies of the National Academy of Sciences of Ukraine.

Since 1970, Ponomarenko was a member of the City Commission on Names and Memorable Signs, the initiator of the introduction and revival of a number of Kyiv toponyms. In the last years of her life, Ponomarenko was an honorary member of the commission.

She was an author of materials on the toponymy of the city in Kyiv: An Encyclopedic Handbook (published in several editions in 1981–1986). She prepared (in co-authorship) a complete encyclopedic reference book of Kyiv street names (1995).

She died in Kyiv; in the last months of her life she was bedridden due to a fracture of the hip joint due to an accident. She was buried in the cemetery of the village of Litky.

== Family ==
Her younger brother died fighting in World War II, shortly before the war's end.

== Books and main publications ==
Published works:

- (Ponomarenko L. A., Riznyk O. O.) Kyiv: Short Toponymic Directory. — Kyiv, 2003. (Ukrainian) Ukrainian: Л Пономаренко L Ponomarenko and O Riznyk. 2003. Київ : Короткий Топонімічний Довідник. Kyïv: Павлім. ISBN 9789666860500, 9666860503, OCLC 55993772.
- (Ponomarenko L., Serenkov L.) Kyiv. History in geographical names. — Kyïv: Centr pamʺjatkoznavstva NAN Ukraïny i UTOPIK. 2007. (Ukrainian) ISBN 9789668999154, 9668999150, OCLC 1227479123

References:

- Plans of the city of Kyiv of the XVII–XIX centuries. as a historical source // Kyivska starovyna. — 1972. — P.62–69. (Ukrainian)
- Topographical descriptions of Kyiv at the end of the 18th and the beginning of the 19th centuries. // Historical studies. Homeland history. — Issue 8. — Kyiv, 1982. — P.39–42. (Ukrainian)
- Geographical, topographical and other official descriptions of Kyiv in the second half of the 18th and early 19th centuries. // Kyiv in the funds of the Central Scientific Library of the Academy of Sciences of the Ukrainian SSR. — Kyiv: Naukova dumka, 1984. — P.62–83.
- Official descriptions of the provinces of the 18th and the first half of the 19th century // Manuscript and book heritage of Ukraine. — Issue 1. — Kyiv, 1993. — P.59–69. (Ukrainian)
- Streets of Kyiv: a handbook. Ed. A. V. Kudrytskyi / Ref. A. V. Kudrytskyi, L. A. Ponomarenko, O. O. Riznyk. Kyiv: Ukrainian Encyclopedia, 1995. (in Ukrainian)
- Portrait on the background of Kyiv. — Kyiv, 2002. (Articles, bibliography).Ukrainian: Київ: Історія В Географічних Назвах : Площі Вулиці Провулки : Короткі Нариси.
- Lidia Antonivna Ponomarenko – historian, Kyiv expert, toponymist: Bio-bibliographic index. — Kyiv: 2012. (Ukrainian)
- Maps and plans in the source studies of Lydia Ponomarenko (with a description of the cartographic sources of the V.I. Vernadsky Manuscript Institute of the NBU and an appendix of information on maps and plans from the history of Ukraine in Russian archival and manuscript collections) / author: A.V. Pivovar – K .: Akademperiodika, 2012. – 668 p.
