= Ukraine (disambiguation) =

Ukraine is an Eastern European country.

Ukraine, Ukraina or Ukrayina may also refer to:

== Historical political entities ==
- The pre-20th century borderland region of the Polish–Lithuanian Commonwealth (later split between the Russian Partition and Austrian Partition)
- One of the names of the Cossack Hetmanate state in 1649–1764
- Ukrainian People's Republic or Ukrainian National Republic, an independent state proclaimed after breakup of the Russian Empire
- Ukrainian State, a government that existed on most of the territory of Ukraine in 1918
- Ukrainian Soviet Socialist Republic, one of the former constituent republics of the Soviet Union, before gaining its independence in 1991
- Reichskommissariat Ukraine, the civilian occupation regime of German-occupied Ukraine during World War II

== Places ==
=== Poland ===
- Ukraina, Lesser Poland Voivodeship
- Ukraina, Łódź Voivodeship

=== Other ===
- Ukraine, Spain (formerly known as Fuentes de Andalucía, before temporarily changing its name in 2022 in honour of the country)
- Ukraina No. 513, a former municipal district in Alberta, Canada

== Other uses ==
- 1709 Ukraina, a main-belt asteroid
- Hotel Ukraina, Moscow, a hotel in Moscow, Russia
- Hotel Ukraine, a hotel in Kyiv, Ukraine
- Palace "Ukraine", a theatre venue for official events in Kyiv
- Rise up, Ukraine!, a series of political protests by opposition parties in Ukraine during 2013
- Ukraina-class motorship, a 1979 class of Russian ships
- Ukraina (ship), a Russian river cruise ship that was renamed to Bulgaria in 2010
- Ukraina Stadium, a multi-purpose stadium in Lviv, Ukraine
- Ukraine Air Enterprise, an airline owned by the Ukrainian government and based in Kyiv
- Ukraine – Forward!, a political party in Ukraine
- Ukraine (TV channel)
- The Voice of Ukraine, a Ukrainian talent show

== See also ==
- Russian invasion of Ukraine, which began in February 2022
- Ukrain
- Ukraina (disambiguation)
- Ukrainia (disambiguation)
- Ukrainian (disambiguation)
- Ukrainians (disambiguation)
- Carpathian Ukraine (disambiguation)
- Name of Ukraine
