= Ukrainian Orthodox Church =

Ukrainian Orthodox Church most commonly refers to:

- Orthodoxy in Ukraine, the sum of Orthodox churches in Ukraine
  - Orthodox Church of Ukraine
  - Ukrainian Orthodox Church (Moscow Patriarchate)

Ukrainian Orthodox Church may also refer to:

- Ukrainian Orthodox Church of Canada, under jurisdiction of the Ecumenical Patriarchate of Constantinople
- Ukrainian Orthodox Church of the USA, under jurisdiction of the Ecumenical Patriarchate of Constantinople
- Ukrainian Orthodox Vicariate Sighetu Marmației, a vicariate of the Romanian Orthodox Church serving Eastern Orthodox believers from Romania's Ukrainian community
- Ukrainian Orthodox Church – Kyiv Patriarchate (UOC-KP) (1992–December 15, 2018; 20 June 2019–), a church in Ukraine that dissolved itself to form the Orthodox Church of Ukraine
- Ukrainian Autocephalous Orthodox Church (UAOC) (1922–December 15, 2018), a former church in Ukraine that dissolved itself to form the Orthodox Church of Ukraine
- Ukrainian Autocephalous Orthodox Church Canonical (1924–) with canonical origin from the Polish Orthodox Church
- Ukrainian Orthodox Greek Catholic Church (2008–), an independent Ukrainian Greek Catholic Church that was established from the official Ukrainian Greek Catholic Church, which self-identifies as both Orthodox and Catholic
- Ukrainian Autonomous Orthodox Church (1941–44), a short-lived Ukrainian church that existed when Ukraine was occupied by Nazi Germany during the Second World War
- Living Church (May 1922–July 26, 1946), an independent liberal church

== See also ==
- Ukrainian Church (disambiguation)
- Ukrainian Catholic Church (disambiguation)
- Ukrainians (disambiguation)
- Ukrainian (disambiguation)
- Ukraine (disambiguation)
- 2018 Moscow–Constantinople schism
- Autocephaly of the Orthodox Church of Ukraine
