= Ukraina (disambiguation) =

Ukraina is the Ukrainian, Russian, or Polish name for Ukraine.

Ukraina may also refer to:

== Places ==
- Ukraina, Łódź Voivodeship, a village in central Poland
- Ukraina, Lesser Poland Voivodeship, a village in southern Poland
- Ukraina No. 513, Alberta, Canada; a municipal district
- Ukraina, North Dakota, a ghost town
- 1709 Ukraina, a main-belt asteroid

=== Facilities and structures ===
- Palace "Ukraine", Kyiv, Ukraine; a theatre
- Ukraina Stadium, Lviv, Ukraine
- Hotel Ukraina (disambiguation)

== Transportation and vehicles ==
- Ukraina-class motorship, a class of Russian ships
  - Ukraina, the first ship in the Ukraina-class motorship
- Ukrainian cruiser Ukraina, a Slava-class missile cruiser

== Other uses ==
- Ukraina.ru, a state-sponsored fake news dissemination website operated by Rossiya Segodnya, owned by the Russian government

== See also ==
- Soviet cruiser Chervona Ukraina
- Soviet battleship Sovietskaya Ukraina
- Ukraine (disambiguation)
- Ukrainia (disambiguation)
- Ukrainian (disambiguation)
- Ukrainians (disambiguation)
