= Hotel Ukraina =

Hotel Ukraina may refer to:

- Hotel Ukraina - the tallest hotel in Europe, and of the Seven Sisters in Moscow
- Hotel Ukraine - a hotel in Kyiv
- Grand Hotel Ukraine, a hotel in Dnipro

== See also ==
- Ukraina (disambiguation)
