= Montenegrin Orthodox Church (disambiguation) =

The Montenegrin Orthodox Church is a non-canonical eastern-orthodox church in Montenegro, created in 1993.

Montenegrin Orthodox Church may also refer to:

- Montenegrin Orthodox Church (2018), another non-canonical eastern-orthodox church in Montenegro, created in 2018
- Serbian Orthodox Church in Montenegro, canonical branch of the Serbian Orthodox Church in Montenegro

== See also ==
- Montenegrin Church (disambiguation)
- Serbian Orthodox Church (disambiguation)
- Serbian Church (disambiguation)
