= Ukrainian Catholic Church =

Ukrainian Catholic Church may refer to:

- the Catholic Church in Ukraine
- the Eastern Catholic Churches which originated in Ukraine that use the Byzantine Rite:
  - Ruthenian Greek Catholic Church
  - Ukrainian Greek Catholic Church
    - Ruthenian Uniate Church
- the Armenian Catholic Archeparchy of Lviv
- the Ukrainian Orthodox Greek Catholic Church, an independent/Sedevacantist Ukrainian Greek Catholic Church that was established in 2008 after separating from the official Ukrainian Greek Catholic Church

== See also ==
- Ukrainian Church (disambiguation)
- Ukrainian Orthodox Church (disambiguation)
- Albanian Catholic Church
- Belarusian Catholic Church
- Bulgarian Catholic Church
- Croatian Catholic Church
- Greek Catholic Church
- Hungarian Catholic Church
- Romanian Catholic Church
- Russian Catholic Church
- Serbian Catholic Church
- Slovak Catholic Church
