= Croatian Catholic Church =

Croatian Catholic Church can refer to:

- Catholic Church in Croatia
- Greek Catholic Church of Croatia and Serbia
- Old Catholic Church of Croatia

== See also ==
- Albanian Catholic Church
- Belarusian Catholic Church
- Bulgarian Catholic Church
- Greek Catholic Church
- Hungarian Catholic Church
- Romanian Catholic Church
- Russian Catholic Church
- Serbian Catholic Church
- Slovak Catholic Church
- Ukrainian Catholic Church
