= Serbian Catholic Church =

The term Serbian Catholic Church can refer to:

- Catholic Church in Serbia, communities and institutions of the Catholic Church in Serbia (including the Latin Church)
- Greek Catholic Eparchy of Ruski Krstur, an eparchy (diocese) for Eastern Catholics of the Byzantine Rite in Serbia
- Serbian Old-Catholic Church, a former old-catholic church in Serbia, that existed in the second half of the 20th century

== See also ==
- Serb-Catholic movement in Dubrovnik
- Serbian Church (disambiguation)
- Serbian Orthodox Church (disambiguation)
- Greek Catholic Church
  - Albanian Catholic Church
  - Belarusian Catholic Church
  - Bulgarian Catholic Church
  - Croatian Catholic Church
  - Hungarian Catholic Church
  - Romanian Catholic Church
  - Russian Greek Catholic Church
  - Slovak Catholic Church
  - Ukrainian Catholic Church
