= Romanian Catholic Church =

Romanian Catholic Church may refer to:

- Catholic Church in Romania, including both Latin and Eastern Catholics
- Romanian Church United with Rome, Greek-Catholic (an Eastern Catholic church of the Byzantine Rite, in full communion with the Church of Rome)

== See also ==
- Albanian Catholic Church
- Belarusian Catholic Church
- Bulgarian Catholic Church
- Croatian Catholic Church
- Greek Catholic Church
- Hungarian Catholic Church
- Russian Catholic Church
- Serbian Catholic Church
- Slovak Catholic Church
- Ukrainian Catholic Church
