= Belarusian Orthodox Church (disambiguation) =

Belarusian Orthodox Church may refer to:

- Belarusian Orthodox Church, canonical branch of the Eastern Orthodox Church in Belarus
- Belarusian Autocephalous Orthodox Church, established in 1922

== See also ==
- Christianity in Belarus
- Belarusian Church (disambiguation)
- Belarusian Catholic Church
