= Montenegrin Church =

The term Montenegrin Church may refer to:

- Montenegrin Orthodox Church (1993), a non-canonical eastern-orthodox church in Montenegro, created in 1993
- Montenegrin Orthodox Church (2018), another non-canonical eastern-orthodox church in Montenegro, created in 2018
- Serbian Orthodox Church in Montenegro, canonical branch of the Serbian Orthodox Church in Montenegro
- Catholic Church in Montenegro, incorporates institutions and communities of the Catholic Church in Montenegro

== See also ==
- Montenegrin Orthodox Church (disambiguation)
- Serbian Orthodox Church (disambiguation)
- Serbian Church (disambiguation)
