= Hungarian Catholic Church =

Hungarian Catholic Church may refer to:

- Catholic Church in Hungary, incorporating all communities and institutions of the Catholic Church in Hungary (including the Latin Church)
- Hungarian Byzantine Catholic Church (an Eastern Catholic church of the Byzantine Rite, in full communion with the Church of Rome)

== See also ==
- Albanian Catholic Church
- Belarusian Catholic Church
- Bulgarian Catholic Church
- Croatian Catholic Church
- Greek Catholic Church
- Romanian Catholic Church
- Russian Catholic Church
- Serbian Catholic Church
- Slovak Catholic Church
- Ukrainian Catholic Church
