= STOC =

STOC may refer to:

- Serbian True Orthodox Church
- Symposium on Theory of Computing
