= Albanian Catholic Church =

The term Albanian Catholic Church can refer to:

- Catholic Church in Albania, incorporating all communities and institutions of the Catholic Church in Albania
- Albanian Greek Catholic Church or Albanian Byzantine Catholic Church, an Eastern Catholic church of the Byzantine Rite in Albania
- Italo-Albanian Catholic Church, an Eastern Catholic church of Byzantine-rite Italo-Albanians in Italy

== See also ==
- Apostolic Administration of Southern Albania
- Belarusian Catholic Church
- Bulgarian Catholic Church
- Croatian Catholic Church
- Greek Catholic Church
- Hungarian Catholic Church
- Romanian Catholic Church
- Russian Catholic Church
- Serbian Catholic Church
- Slovak Catholic Church
- Ukrainian Catholic Church
