= Bulgarian Catholic Church =

The term Bulgarian Catholic Church can refer to:

- Catholic Church in Bulgaria, communities and institutions of the Catholic Church in Bulgaria (including the Latin Church)
- Bulgarian Byzantine Catholic Church, a "sui juris" Eastern Catholic Church of the Byzantine Rite in Bulgaria
- Bulgarian Catholic Apostolic Exarchate of Sofia, an Apostolic Exarchate for Eastern Catholics of the Byzantine Rite in Bulgaria

== See also ==
- Bulgarian Catholic Apostolic Vicariate of Constantinople
- Bulgarian Catholic Apostolic Vicariate of Thrace
- Bulgarian Catholic Apostolic Vicariate of Macedonia
- Albanian Catholic Church
- Belarusian Catholic Church
- Croatian Catholic Church
- Greek Catholic Church
- Hungarian Catholic Church
- Romanian Catholic Church
- Russian Catholic Church
- Serbian Catholic Church
- Slovak Catholic Church
- Ukrainian Catholic Church
