= Khrennikov =

Khrennikov is a surname which may refer to:

- Tikhon Khrennikov (1913–2007), Russian composer and pianist
- Aleksandr Khrennikov (1896–1984), Russian-Canadian engineer
- Vladimir Khrennikov (1876–1935), Ukrainian estate owner known the Khrennikov House.
