= State Management of Affairs (Ukraine) =

The State Directorate of Affairs (Ukrainian: Державне управління справами, romanized: Derzhavne upravlinnya spravamy, IPA: [derˈʒɑu̯ne ʊprɐu̯ˈl⁽ʲ⁾inʲːɐ ˈsprɑwɐmɪ], lit. 'State managerial directorate'; ДУС) is the Ukrainian government agency that is responsible for the management of public and social services which are determined by the president and parliament of Ukraine. The agency does this through the administration of several state owned companies and organisations. It is financed by the government. The president appoints the head of the agency based on the recommendations of his administration.

== Companies, institutions and service organizations ==
- Hotel Ukrayina
- Ukraine Air Enterprise
- Boryspil International Airport ("Hall of Official Delegations")
- Harant – servis (catering)
- Derzhpostachannya (government post)
- Cossack Hall (restaurant)
- Ukrzhytloservis (Ukrainian housing service construction, dealer of Saeco products)
- Komunar (beauty salon, clothing alteration, medical et al.)
- Administrative Buildings Management (leasing company for office properties)
- Avtobaza DUS (motor pool)
- President-Hotel, Kyiv (closed joint stock company)

== Sanatoriums and resorts ==
- Crimea
- Zori Ukrayiny resort and sanatorium (Yalta)
- Pivdenny sanatorium (Yalta)
- Chornomorsky sanatorium (Yalta)
- Hurzuf sanatorium (Hurzuf)
- Alushta sanatorium (Alushta)
- Artek international children's camp (Hurzuf)
- "Raduha" (Bakhchysarai Raion children's camp and home)
- Morshyn sanatorium (Morshyn, West Ukraine)
- Crystal Palace sanatorium (Truskavets, West Ukraine)
- Zbruch sanatorium (Husyatyn, West Ukraine)
- "Svitanok" children's camp (Kyiv)
- Koncha-Zaspa sanatorium and holiday home (Kyiv)
- "Pushcha-Vodytsia" recreation park (Kyiv)
- Kindergarten 73 and 182
- "Semashko" sanatorium and preventive health institute (Kislovodsk, Russia)
- "Ukraine" sanatorium (Yessentuki, Russia)
- "Psou" holiday home (Gantiadi, Georgia)

== Cultural institutions ==
- Expocenter of Ukraine (national exposition centre)
- Ukrainian House (national centre of business and cultural cooperation)
- "Ukrayina" (national institute of the arts)
- Ukrainian cultural centre (Moscow)
- Mystetskyi Arsenal National Art and Culture Museum Complex

== National parks and nature reserves ==
- Crimean (nature reserve)
- Azov-Sivash (national park)
- "Bilo-ozerske" (forestry department)
- "Zalissya" (lodge)
- "Synyohora" (lodge)

== Industry ==
- "Ukraine Press" (publishing)
- Construction
- "Ukrinvestbud" (investment)
- "Zhytomyr" (brewery)
- "Prioritety" (institute of science)

== Medical institutions ==
- Research institute of preventive and clinical medicine.
- "Feofaniya" hospital
- "Polyclinic 1"
- "Polyclinic 2"
- Institute of public health research
- Pharmaceutical department
