= Ukrainians (disambiguation) =

Ukrainians may refer to:

- in terms of ethnicity: Ukrainians, an East Slavic people, from Eastern Europe
- in terms of citizenship: Ukrainians (citizens), citizens of Ukraine, a country in Eastern Europe
- in music: The Ukrainians, a band from the United Kingdom
  - The Ukrainians (album), a 1991 album by the titular band
- Montreal Ukrainians, a sports team in Montreal, Quebec, Canada
- Toronto Ukrainians, a sports team in Toronto, Ontario, Canada

== See also ==
- Ukrainian Orthodox Church (disambiguation)
- Ukrainian (disambiguation)
- Ukraine (disambiguation)
- Ukraina (disambiguation)
- Ukrainia (disambiguation)
- Afro-Ukrainians
- Languages of Ukraine
- Name of Ukraine
