= Ukrainia (disambiguation) =

Ukrainia may refer to:

- The land of Ukraine
- The land of the Ukrainians, an ethnic territory
- Montreal Ukrainia, a sports team in Canada
- Toronto Ukrainia, a sports team in Canada

== See also ==
- Ukraina (disambiguation)
- Ukraine (disambiguation)
- Ukrainian (disambiguation)
- Ukrainians (disambiguation)
