= Serbian Church (disambiguation) =

The Serbian Orthodox Church is an Eastern Orthodox Church.

Serbian Church may also refer to:

- Serbian True Orthodox Church, a non-canonical Eastern Orthodox church
- Catholic Church in Serbia
- Greek Catholic Eparchy of Ruski Krstur, an eparchy (diocese) for Eastern Catholics of the Byzantine Rite in Serbia

== See also ==
- Serbian Orthodox Church (disambiguation)
- Serbian Catholic Church
- Montenegrin Church (disambiguation)
