= Belarusian Catholic Church =

Belarusian Catholic Church may refer to:

- Catholic Church in Belarus, incorporating all communities and institutions of the Catholic Church in Belarus
- Belarusian Byzantine Catholic Church, an Eastern Catholic church of the Byzantine Rite, centered in Belarus

== See also ==
- Belarusian Church (disambiguation)
- Belarusian Orthodox Church
- Albanian Catholic Church
- Bulgarian Catholic Church
- Croatian Catholic Church
- Greek Catholic Church
- Hungarian Catholic Church
- Romanian Catholic Church
- Russian Catholic Church
- Serbian Catholic Church
- Slovak Catholic Church
- Ukrainian Catholic Church
