= Ginsburg Skyscraper =

Hotel in Ukraine

The Ginzburg Skyscraper
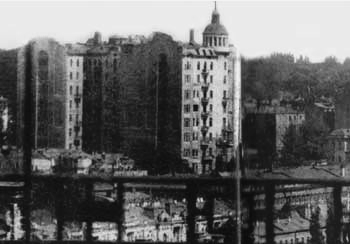
- Interactive map of the The Ginzburg Skyscraper area

General information
- Status: Destroyed
- Architectural style: Modern
- Location: Kyiv, Ukraine
- Coordinates: 50°26′54.75″N 30°31′37.95″E
- Construction started: 1910
- Completed: 1912
- Demolished: 1941
- Owner: Lev Borisovich Ginzburg

Height
- Height: 53 m (174 ft) roof, 67.5 m (221 ft) spire

Technical details
- Floor count: 12

Design and construction
- Architects: Adolf Minkus, Fyodor Troupianskyi

The Ginzburg Skyscraper, or Ginzburg House, was a 12-story, 67.5 m (221 ft) skyscraper in Kyiv. Known as "Ukraine's first skyscraper" and Europe's tallest building before 1925 in terms of roof height, it was completed in 1912 and destroyed in 1941.

== History ==
The house was built between 1910–1912. It was used as a revenue house. The skyscraper had 94 flats with 500 rooms in all, the largest of which had 11 rooms, and the building had lifts by the American company Otis Worldwide. The building stood on hilly terrain and therefore had varying numbers of storeys (8–12 storeys). Because the skyscraper was well planned, the contractor was asked to build skyscrapers in Chicago, but he declined for unknown reasons.

A shopping center was located on the first floors of Ginzburg's building. The building had a tower offering a panorama of Kyiv.

In the autumn of 1913, the artist Oleksandr Murashko opened the "Art Studio of Oleksandr Murashko" on the 12th floor of the skyscraper, in which almost 100 people studied at the same time. In addition to drawing and painting, lectures were given on the history and philosophy of art. The studio existed until 1917.

In April 1918, the French Military mission of the Ukrainian People's Republic, consisting of 6 officers, was housed in this building.

The building was used in the filming of the experimental Soviet film Man with a Movie Camera in 1929, in which the tower and the inner courtyard of the skyscraper were shot.

The building was blown up by retreating NKVD forces on 24 September 1941, in the aftermath of Operation Barbarossa, the Nazi German invasion of the Soviet Union. This was part of the Soviet military's scorched earth strategy, as commanders believed German soldiers would be quartered in central Kyiv. In addition to this building, around 100 houses on Khreshchatyk Street and adjacent streets were blown up. In 1953, the foundations of the building were finally demolished.

In 1954–1961, the Moscow Hotel (since 2001, the Hotel Ukraine) was built on the site of the Ginzburg House.

== Gallery ==
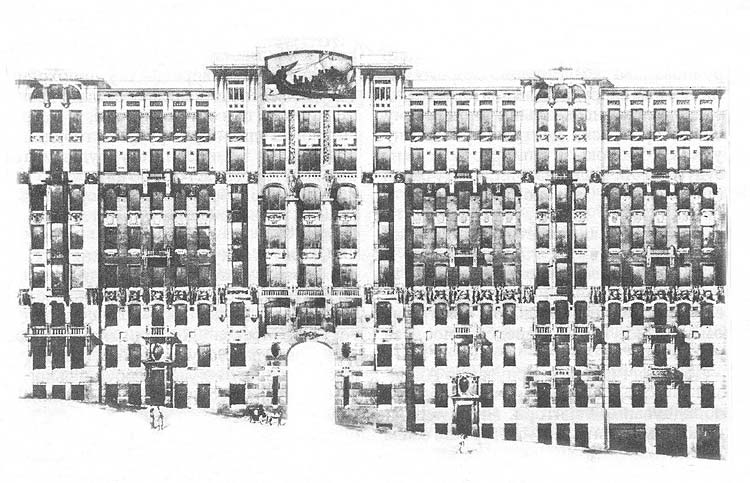
Design of a skyscraper (1910)

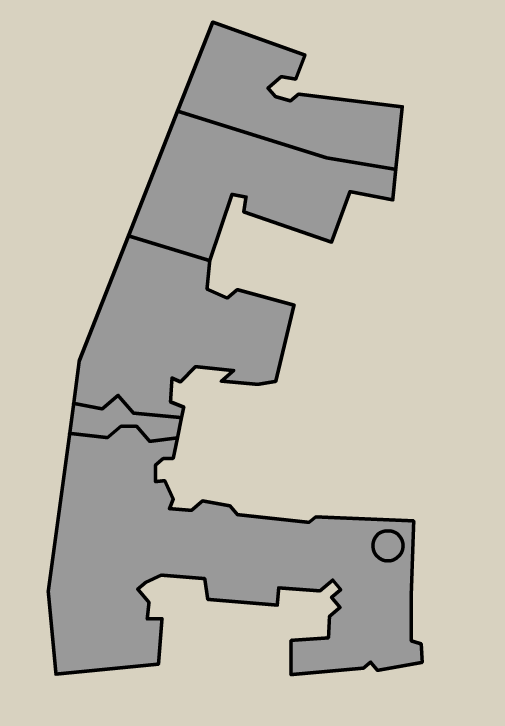
Building shape (top view)

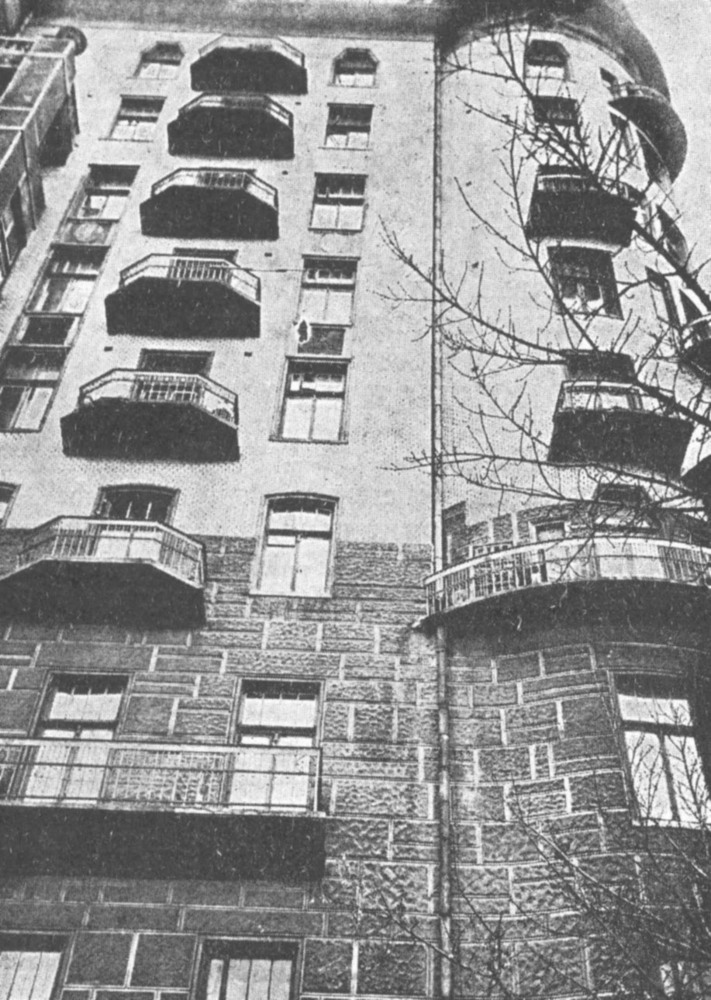
A view of the walls

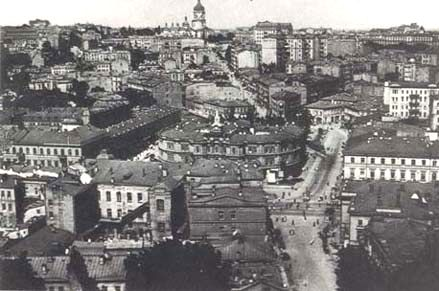
View from a skyscraper window

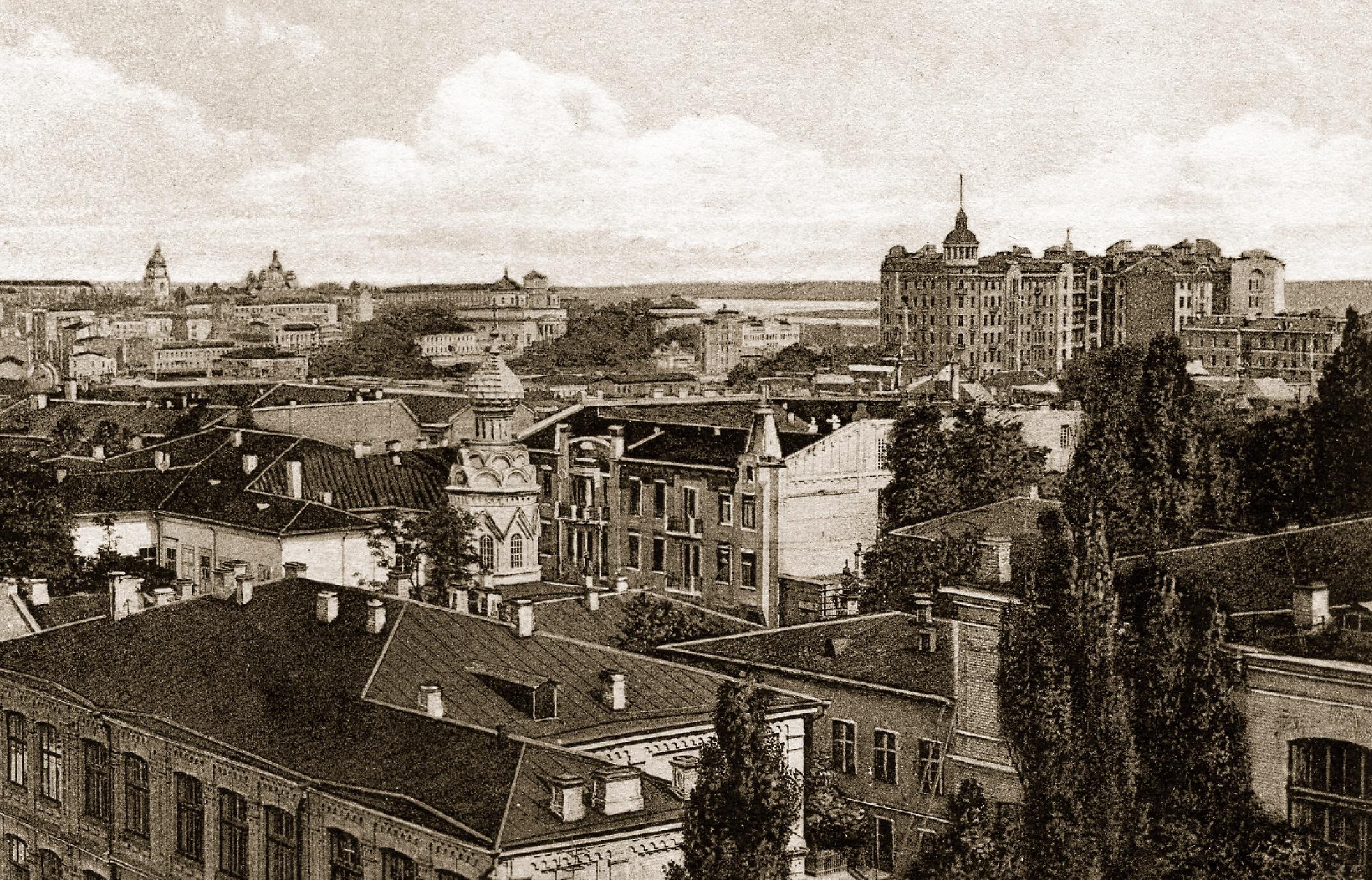
View of Kiev, the Ginzburg skyscraper on the right

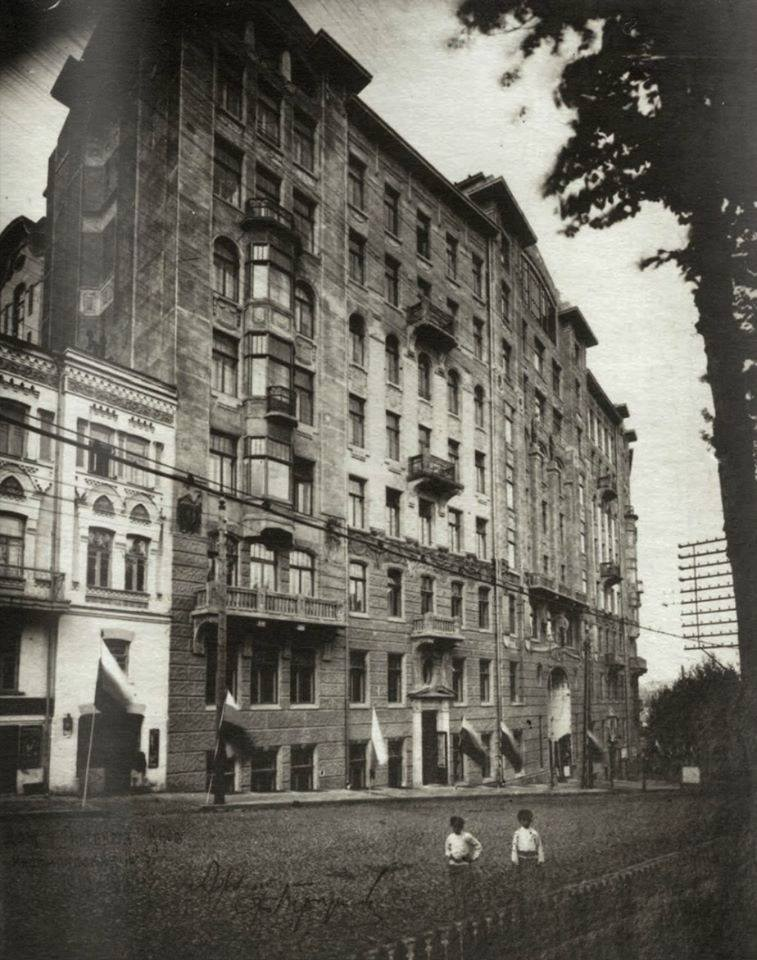
View of Ginzburg's house from the street (1910s)

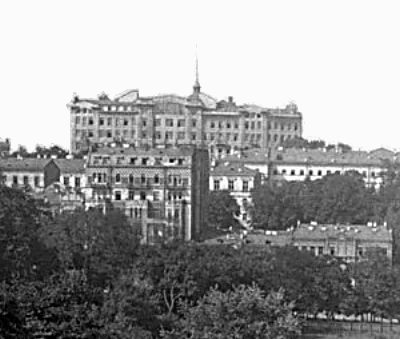
View from a distance

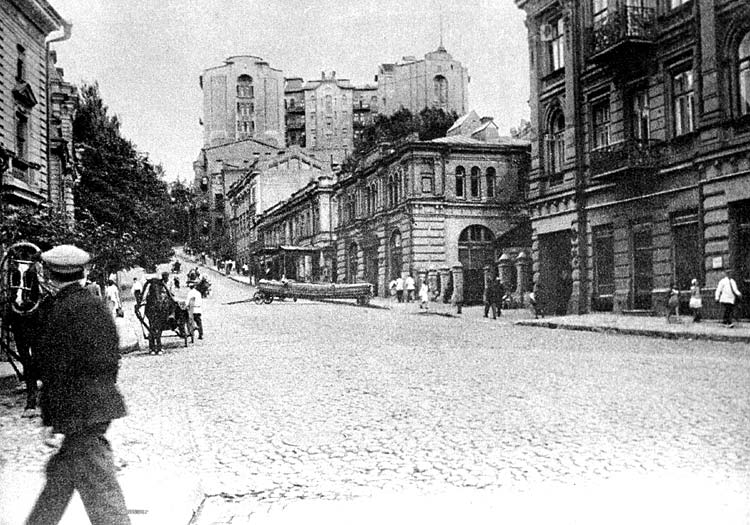
View from the street (1913)

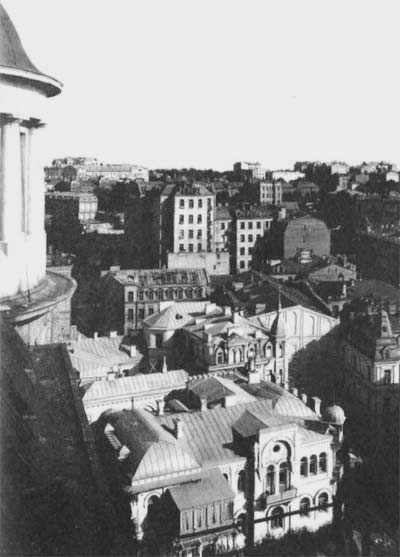
View from the 12th floor of the skyscraper (1914)

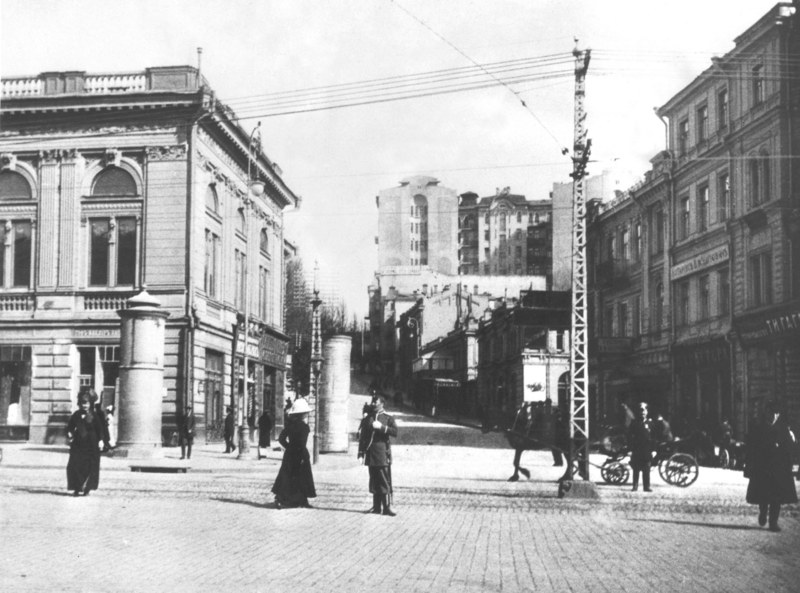
1910s

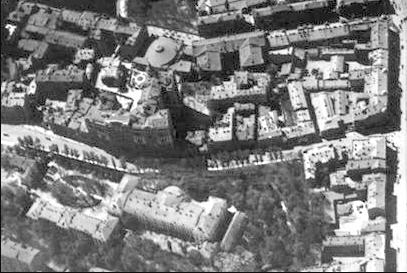
During a German aerial survey (1918). Almost all of the buildings to the right of the skyscraper have not survived

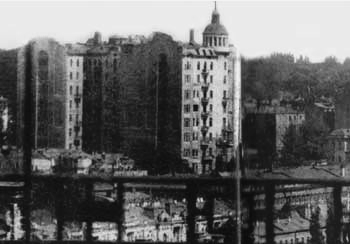
View from a distance

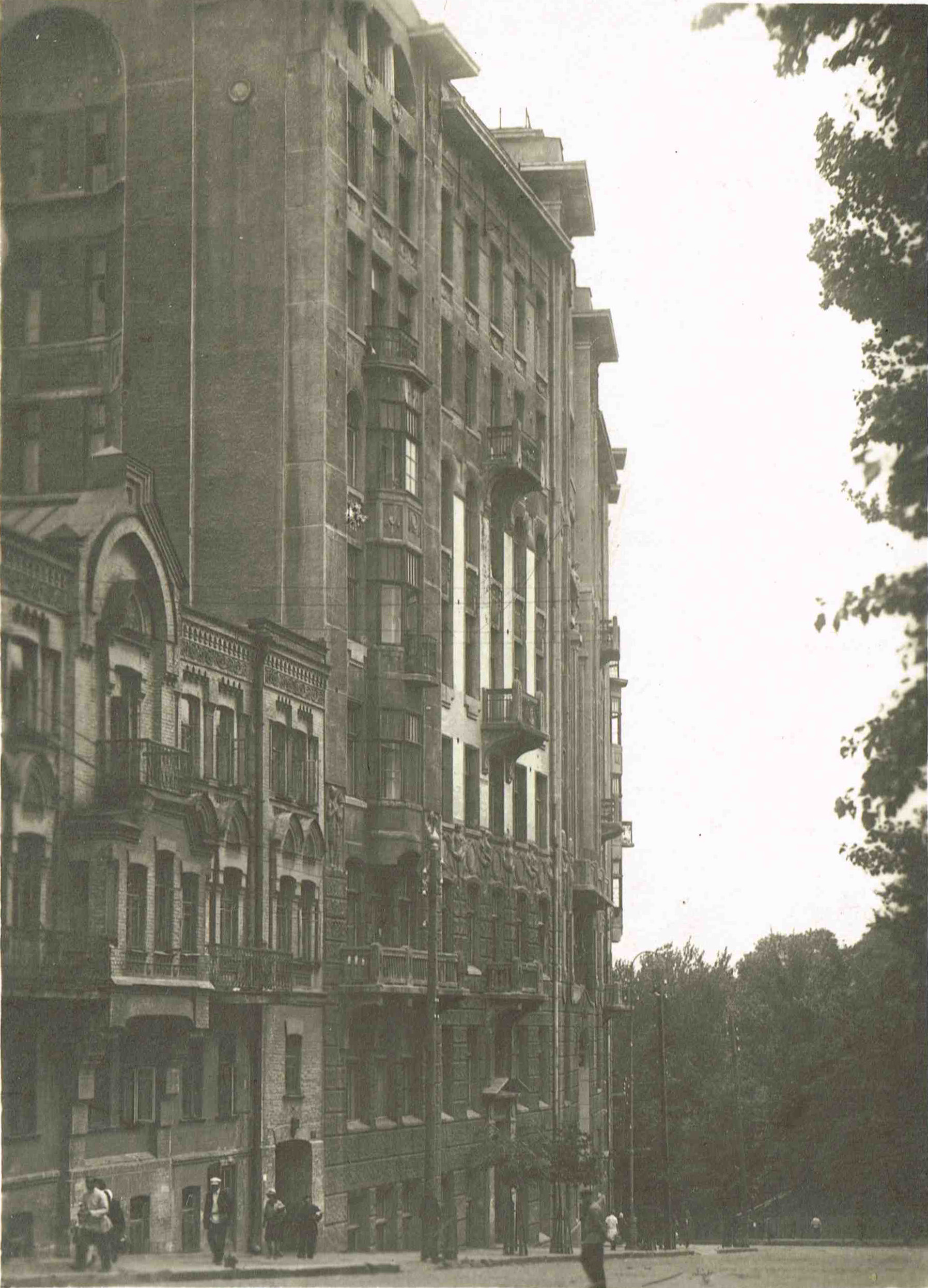
1920s

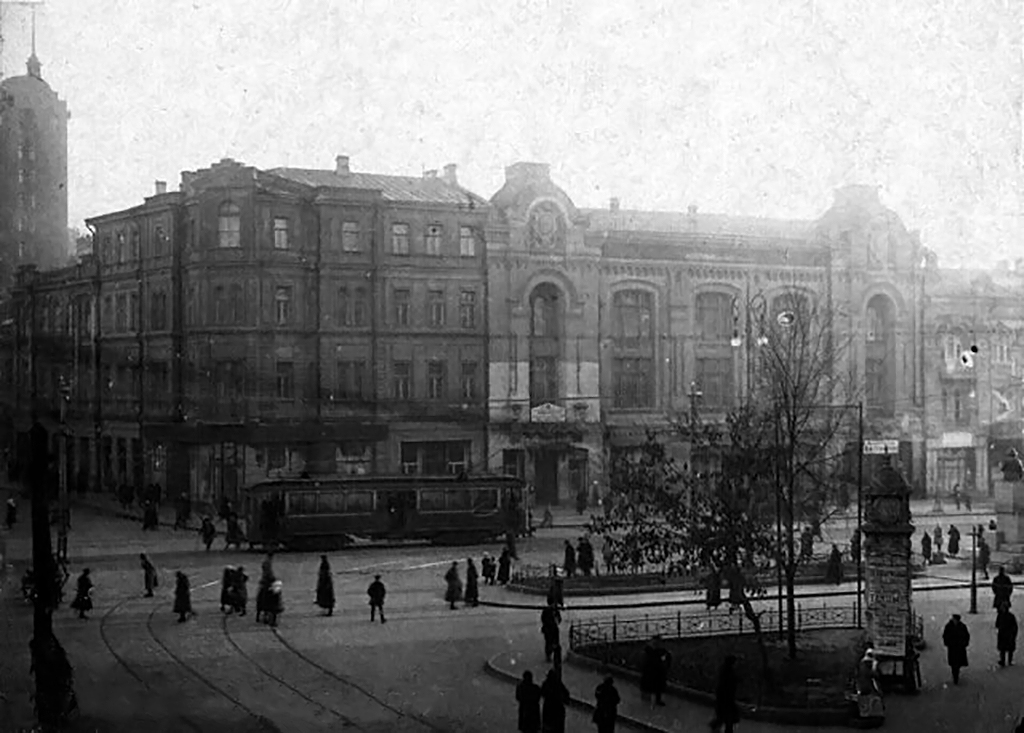
View from Soviet Square in 1925

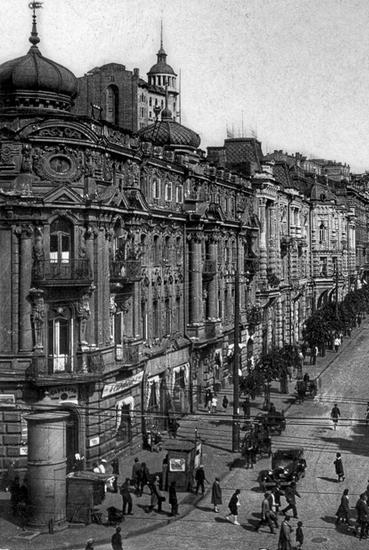
Ginzburg's house during the 1920s

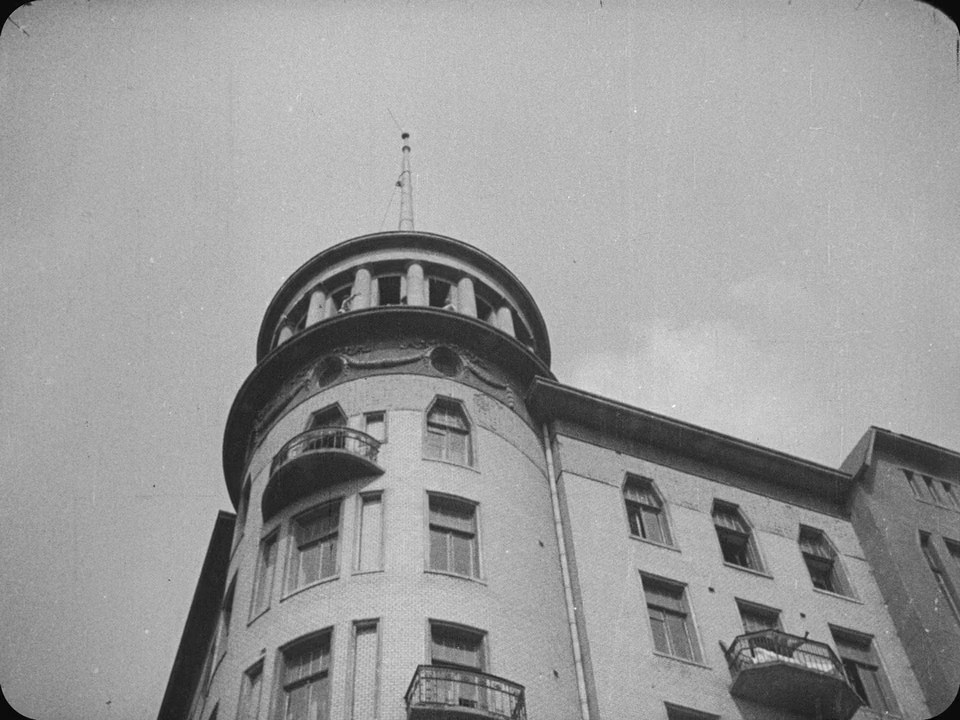
The tower of a skyscraper: a still from the film «Man with a Movie Camera»

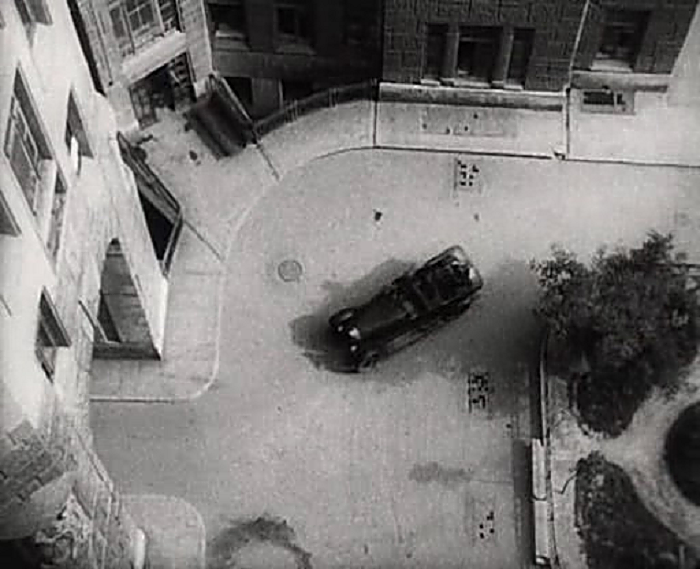
Courtyard: a still from the film «Man with a Movie Camera»

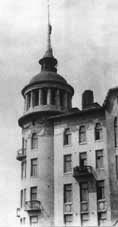
The tower of the house (1932)

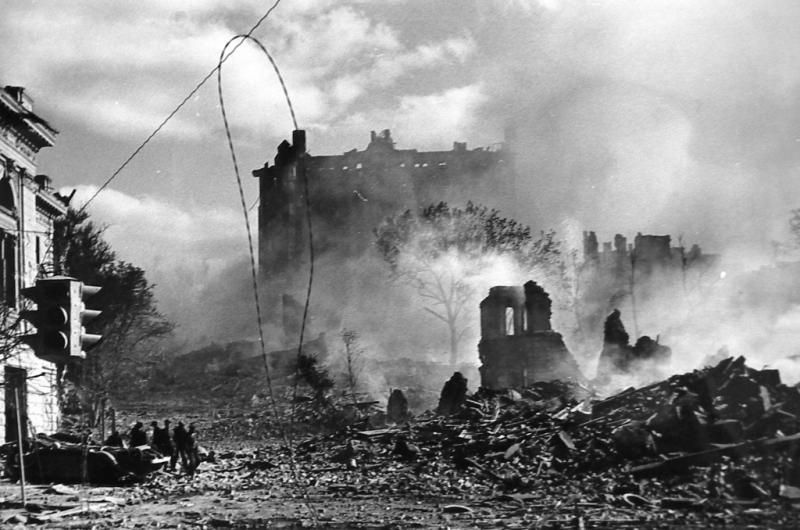
Remains of the house (1941)

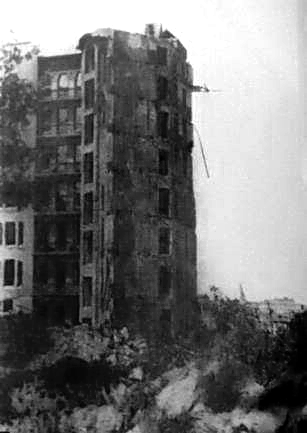
Destroyed building

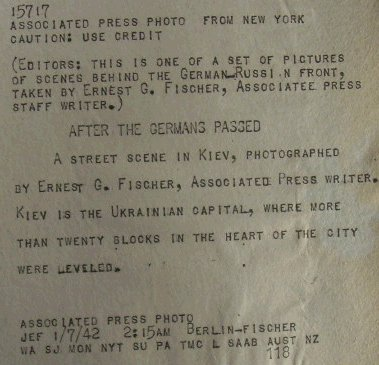
Photo-description of the destroyed skyscraper

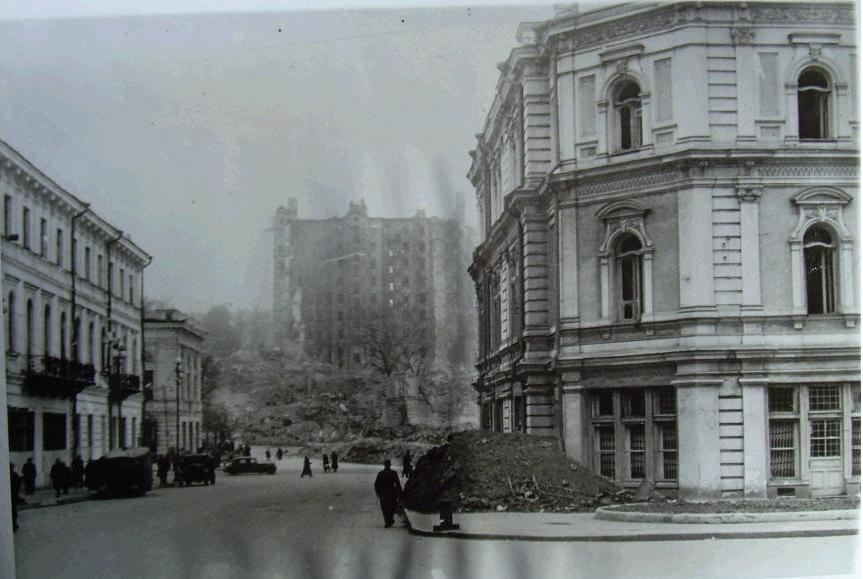
July 1, 1942

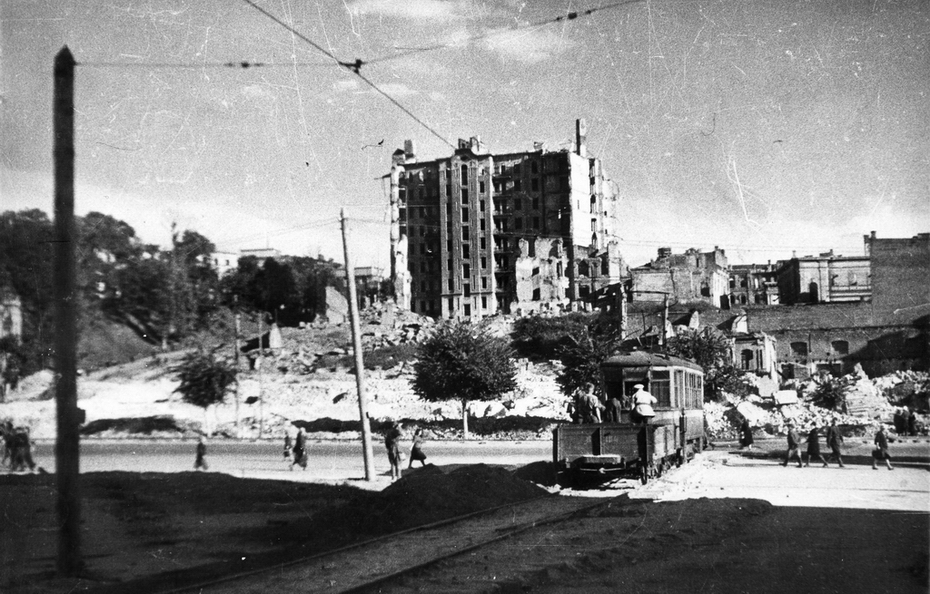
1944

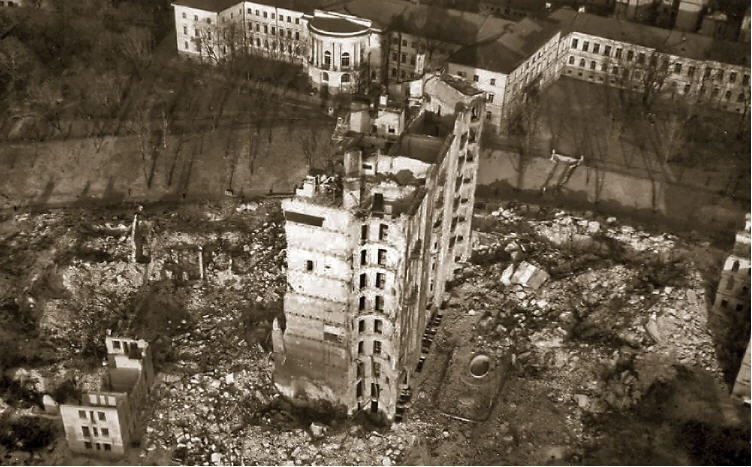
A bird's eye view of the building's ruins

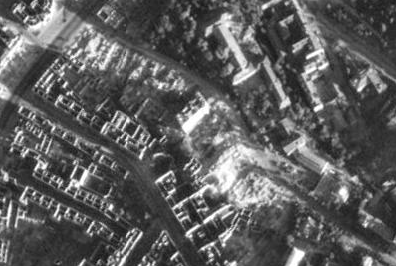
Aerial view of the destroyed skyscraper
