= Maksym Krippa =

Ukrainian entrepreneur and investor

Maksym Volodymyrovych Krippa
- Максим Володимирович Кріппа
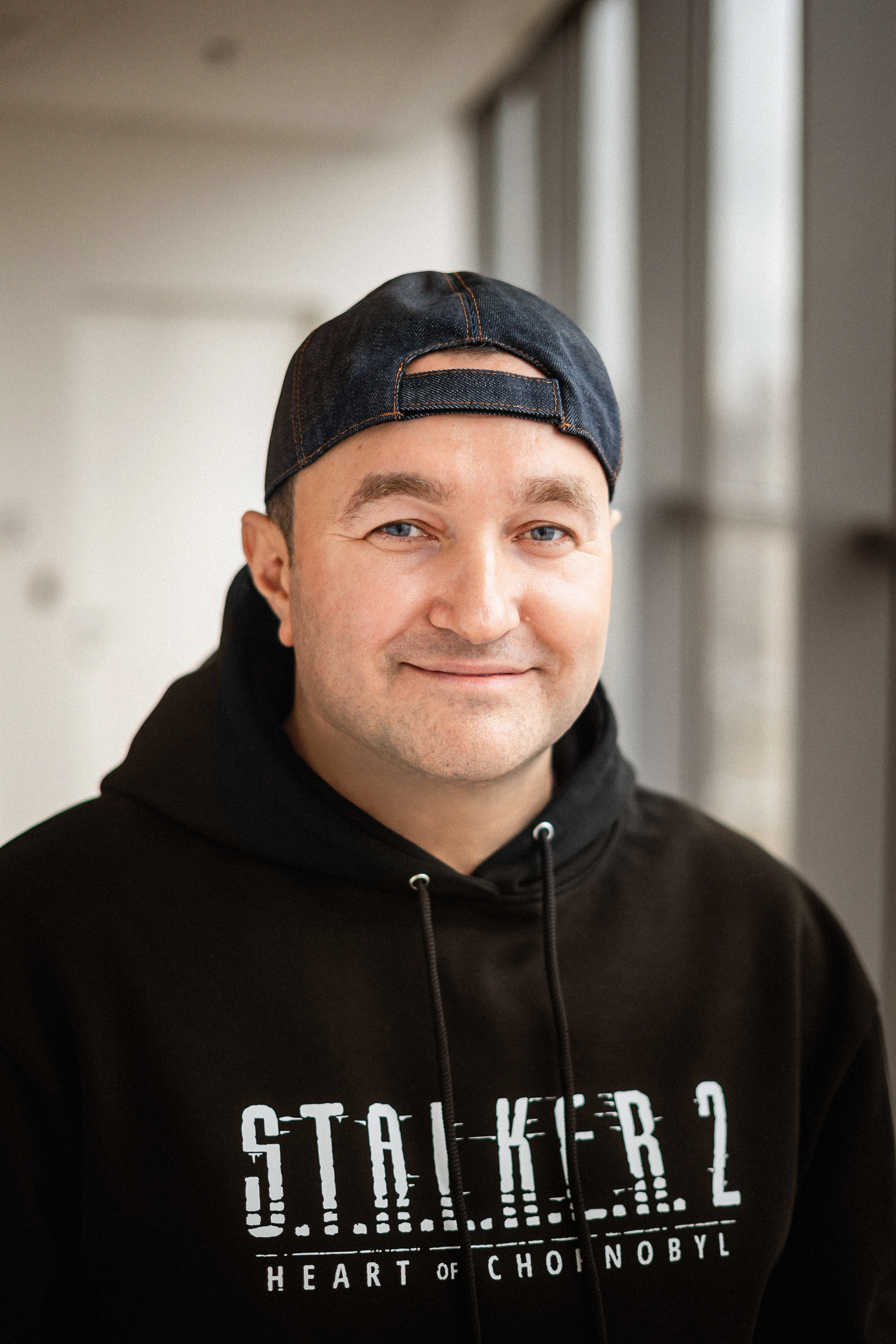
- Born: 11 August 1977 (age 48); Kyiv, Ukraine
- Education: International Christian University, Taras Shevchenko National University of Kyiv, European University
- Occupations: Entrepreneur, investor
- Known for: Owner of the Parus Business Centre and Hotel Ukraine, founder of Ola Fine and Midal companies, owner of NAVI, GSC Game World, Maincast

Maksym Volodymyrovych Krippa (Ukrainian: Максим Володимирович Кріппа) is a Ukrainian entrepreneur and investor. He is the founder of several Ukrainian companies, including Ola Fine, which owns the Parus Business Center and Hotel Ukraine, as well as Midal, which owns multiple real estate properties in Kyiv and the Kyiv Oblast.

Since 2018, Krippa has been the owner of the esports team Natus Vincere (NAVI), and since 2020, he has been the beneficial owner of GSC Game World, a video game development company known for the Cossacks and S.T.A.L.K.E.R. series. In 2022, he established the MK Foundation charity. Since 2023, he has been the owner of the esports broadcasting studio Maincast.

== Early life and education ==
Maksym Krippa was born and raised in Kyiv. He received his education at universities in the capital. From 1994 to 1998, he studied for a bachelor's degree in Business Administration and Management at the International Christian University. From 2006 to 2007, he completed a master's program in Organizational Management at the European University, graduating with honors. In 2008, he enrolled at Taras Shevchenko National University of Kyiv to study Law and graduated with honors.

== Career ==
=== Entrepreneurial activities ===
Maksym Krippa's entrepreneurial career began in the 2000s with wholesale and retail trade in mobile communications, as well as mobile communication services. He was an official dealer of Kyivstar GSM and managed the company Ukrainian Mobile TeleSystems, which developed a network of mobile communication salons and service centers across Ukraine. This business later served as the foundation for his investments in IT and software development.

==== Real estate ====
One of Krippa's main business activities is investment in real estate and development. His portfolio includes both financially successful projects and historical buildings requiring renovation.

As of September 2024, Krippa is among the top ten largest business center owners in Ukraine. The total area of business centers he owns is 74,730 square meters. His assets include the Parus Business Center and Hotel Ukraine, both acquired through public auctions in 2023–2024.

===== Parus Business Center =====
On 1 December 2023, Maksym Krippa became the owner of the Parus Business Centre. On 30 November 2023, his company Ola Fine received permission to acquire a controlling stake of over 50% in Parus Holding LLC, which owns Peredovi Tekhnolohii Plus LLC, the registered owner of the Parus business center. Since December 2023, official registry data has listed Krippa as the sole beneficial owner.

===== Hotel Ukraine =====
On 18 September 2024, Ola Fine won an open auction for the privatization of Ukraine Hotel. The bidding included three participants: Alarit-Prom LLC (UAH 1.16 billion), Zhytomyr Furniture Factory PJSC (UAH 1.45 billion), and Ola Fine LLC (UAH 2.51 billion). Krippa's company offered a bid 2.4 times higher than the starting price. Including taxes, the total payment of UAH 3.12 billion was made in full.

As per privatization conditions, the new owner is required to settle the hotel's debts to employees, the state and creditors, and must maintain the primary business activity without layoffs for at least the first six months.

The acquisition cost of some investment properties is under a non-disclosure agreement, so Krippa does not disclose the total investment amount in real estate.

=== Esports ===
==== Natus Vincere (NAVI) ====
Krippa's first investment in esports was the acquisition of Ukraine's most famous esports organization, NAVI, in 2018.

Over the past few years, NAVI has grown into one of the largest multi-gaming organizations, fielding teams in nine disciplines, including Counter-Strike 2, Dota 2, VALORANT, Brawl Stars, PUBG, PUBG Mobile, Clash of Clans and others. NAVI's Counter-Strike 2 team is among the most decorated in the world, winning two out of three major tournaments in 2024—PGL Major Copenhagen 2024 and Esports World Cup 2024.

==== Maincast ====
In 2023, Maksym Krippa became the full owner of Maincast, the largest esports broadcasting studio in Eastern Europe. After Russia's full-scale invasion of Ukraine in February 2022, the company refused Russian-language broadcasting rights and focused on developing Ukrainian-language esports coverage.

As of 2023, Maincast held 90% of the Ukrainian-language broadcasting rights for top-tier tournaments, including ESL Pro Tour (Dota 2/CS:GO), DreamLeague (Dota 2), BLAST Premier (CS:GO), and DPC leagues for all regions (Dota 2). By 2024, the company had become the primary broadcaster for major esports events. On 30 November 2024, Maincast launched a television channel available on OTT platforms and regional IPTV providers, with distribution managed by 1+1 Distribution. The channel broadcasts S-Tier esports tournaments in Counter-Strike 2, Dota 2, Tom Clancy's Rainbow Six, and VALORANT, along with analytical programs, podcasts, shows, and esports news.

=== Game development ===
In 2020, Krippa acquired a 40% stake in GSC Game World, the developer of Cossacks, S.T.A.L.K.E.R., WarCraft 2000: Nuclear Epidemic, Venom: Codename Outbreak, and other games, becoming a co-owner and funding the development of S.T.A.L.K.E.R. 2 from his personal finances. In 2023, he acquired an additional 42% stake, becoming the beneficial owner of the studio.

Due to the full-scale invasion of Ukraine, GSC Game World underwent significant operational changes. The company's headquarters were relocated from Kyiv to Prague; however, GSC Game World continues to position itself as a Ukrainian game developer. The company has also decided to remove the Russian localization of S.T.A.L.K.E.R. 2: Heart of Chornobyl and cease sales in Russia.

The release of S.T.A.L.K.E.R. 2: Heart of Chornobyl took place on November 20, 2024. Within two days of its launch, the game sold its first million copies. The game's release was delayed several times due to Russian hackers leaking early development builds online and arson attacks on company servers. Despite these challenges, S.T.A.L.K.E.R. 2 was recognized as the most anticipated game of 2024 by PC Gaming Show before its launch.

== Charity ==
=== MK Foundation ===
In May 2022, Maksym Krippa founded the MK Foundation. The organization does not accept public donations and operates using private capital. Its primary focus is providing material and technical support to Ukraine's Defence Forces.

On 8 July 2024, following a missile attack that damaged the "Ohmatdyt" children's hospital, GSC Game World and MK Foundation donated 10 million UAH to a fundraising campaign organized by UNITED24.
