= Belarusian Church =

Belarusian Church may refer to:

- Belarusian Orthodox Church, canonical branch of the Eastern Orthodox Church in Belarus
- Belarusian Autocephalous Orthodox Church, established in 1922
- Belarusian Byzantine Catholic Church, an Eastern Catholic church of the Byzantine Rite, centered in Belarus
- Catholic Church in Belarus, incorporating all communities and institutions of the Catholic Church in Belarus

== See also ==
- Christianity in Belarus
- Belarusian Orthodox Church (disambiguation)
- Belarusian Catholic Church
