= Slovak Church =

Slovak Church may refer to:

- Catholic Church in Slovakia, incorporating all communities and institutions of the Catholic Church in Slovakia
- Slovak Byzantine Catholic Church, an Eastern Catholic church of the Byzantine Rite, centered in Slovakia
- Czech and Slovak Orthodox Church, canonical branch of the Eastern Orthodox Church in Czech Republic and Slovakia
- Slovak Evangelical Church, evangelical church of the Augsburg Confession in Slovakia
- Slovak Old-Catholic Church, an Old Catholic Church in Slovakia

== See also ==
- Slovak Catholic Church
