= Ukraine Air Enterprise =

Ukrainian airline

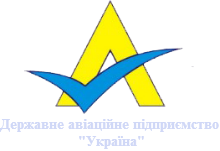
IATA	ICAO	Call sign
-	UKN	ENTERPRISE UKRAINE
- Founded: 1996; 30 years ago
- Hubs: Boryspil International Airport
- Fleet size: 1
- Parent company: State Management of Affairs
- Headquarters: Boryspil, Ukraine
- Website: saeukraine.org.ua

Ukraine Air Enterprise (Ukrainian: Державне авіаційне підприємство «Україна», romanized: Derzhavne aviatsiine pidpryiemstvo "Ukraina") is a government-owned airline based in Kyiv, Ukraine. It was established and started operations in 1996 and operates wet-lease flights on behalf of a number of local organisations including the Ukrainian government.

== Fleet ==
=== Current fleet ===
As of August 2025, Ukraine Air Enterprise operates the following aircraft:

Ukraine Air Enterprise fleet
Aircraft	In fleet	Orders	Passengers	Notes
Antonov An-148-100	1	—		
Total	1			

=== Former fleet ===
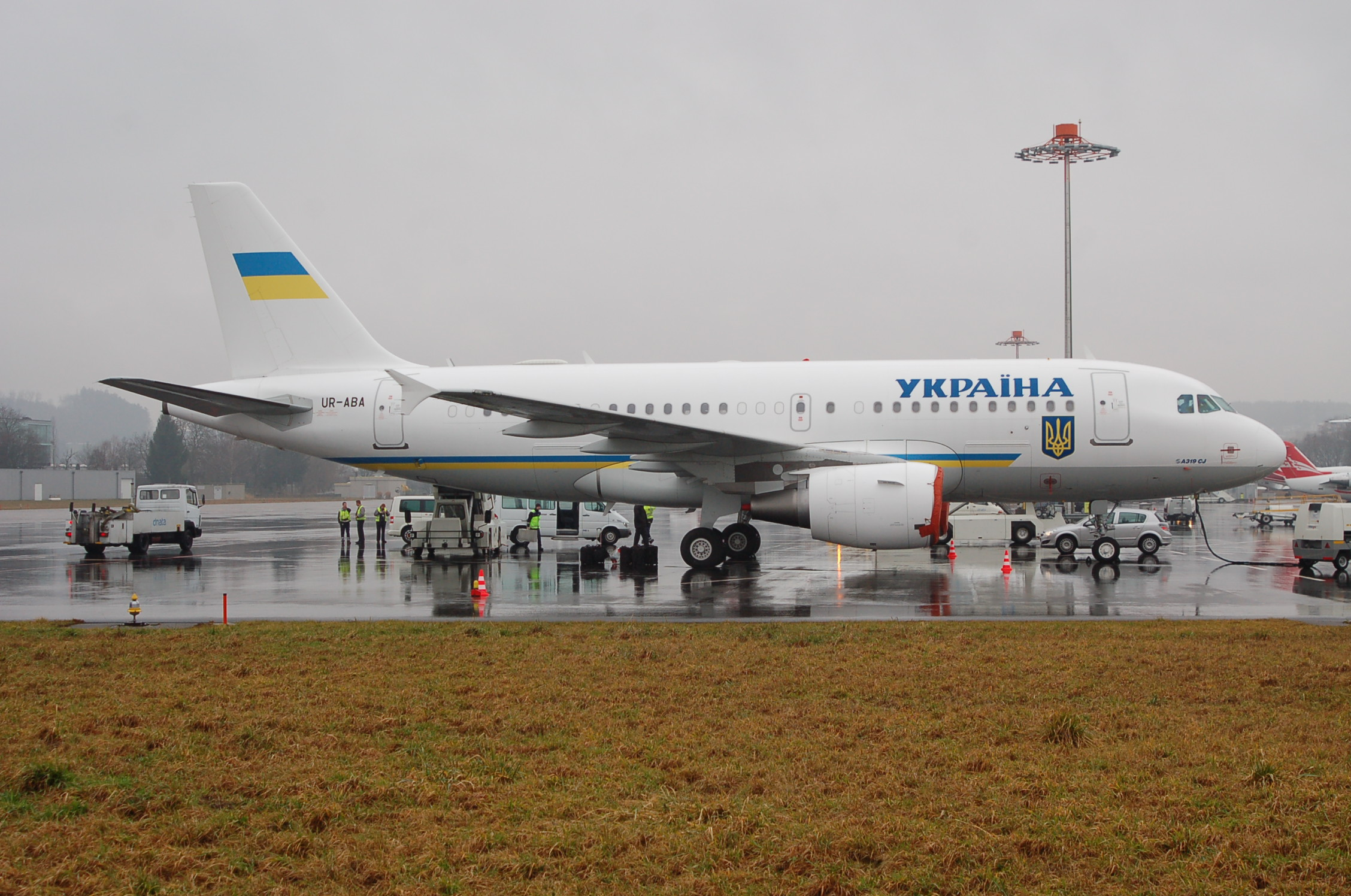
Ukraine Air Enterprise Airbus A319CJ

The Ukraine Air Enterprise fleet consisted of the following aircraft (as of March 2018):

Ukraine Air Enterprise former fleet
Aircraft	In fleet	Orders	Passengers	Notes
Airbus A319CJ	1	—		business jet, UR-ABA
Antonov An-74TK-300	1	—		UR-AWB
Antonov An-148-100	1	—		UR-UKR
Mil Mi-8	1	—		UR-PAB
Total	4			
