= Charta Oecumenica =

European ecumenical document

The Charta Oecumenica (Latin for "Ecumenical Charter") is a joint document from the Conference of European Churches (CEC) and the Council of the Bishops' Conferences of Europe (CCEE, Consilium Conferentiarum Episcoporum Europae) which contains guidelines for increasing co-operation among the churches in Europe. It was signed by the presidents of the CEC and the CCEE on 22 April 2001 (Sunday after Easter) on the occasion of the European ecumenical meeting in Strasbourg.

The revised and expanded version of the Charta Oecumenica was adopted in 2025.
