= Ukrainian =

Ukrainian may refer or relate to:

- Ukraine, a country in Eastern Europe
- Ukrainians, an East Slavic ethnic group
- Ukrainian language, an East Slavic language
- Ukrainian cuisine, cooking traditions of the people of Ukraine

== See also ==
- Ukrainians (disambiguation)
- Ukraine (disambiguation)
- Ukraina (disambiguation)
- Ukrainia (disambiguation)
