= Serbian Orthodox Church (disambiguation) =

The Serbian Orthodox Church is an autocephalous Eastern Orthodox Christian church.

Serbian Orthodox Church may also refer to:

- Serbian True Orthodox Church, a non-canonical Eastern Orthodox church in Serbia
- Free Serbian Orthodox Church, a defunct non-canonical branch (1963-1991) of the Serbian Orthodox Church

== See also ==
- Serbian Church (disambiguation)
- Serbian Catholic Church
