= 1709 Ukraina =

Main-belt asteroid

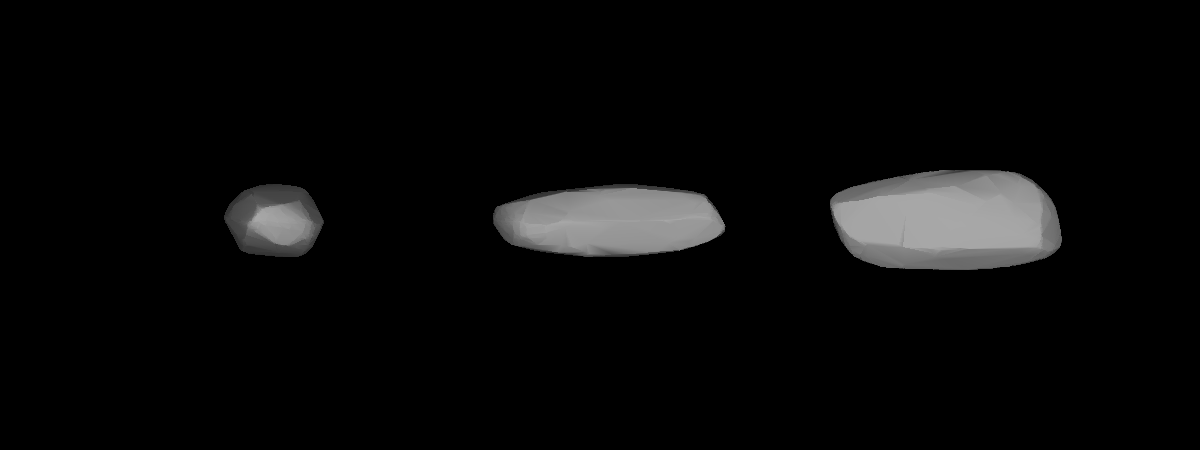
- Lightcurve-based 3D-model of Ukraina

Discovery
- Discovered by: G. Shajn
- Discovery site: Simeiz Obs.
- Discovery date: 16 August 1925

Designations
- Named after: Ukraine (former Soviet state)
- Alternative designations: 1925 QA · 1936 QH
- Minor planet category: main-belt · (inner)

Orbital characteristics
- Epoch 4 September 2017 (JD 2458000.5)
- Uncertainty parameter 0
- Observation arc: 91.69 yr (33,488 days)
- Aphelion: 2.8870 AU
- Perihelion: 1.8702 AU
- Semi-major axis: 2.3786 AU
- Eccentricity: 0.2137
- Orbital period (sidereal): 3.67 yr (1,340 days)
- Mean anomaly: 22.534°
- Mean motion: 0° 16^{m} 7.32^{s} / day
- Inclination: 7.5550°
- Longitude of ascending node: 300.07°
- Argument of perihelion: 42.615°

Physical characteristics
- Dimensions: 8.15 km (derived); 9.444±1.398 km 10.79±0.22 km
- Synodic rotation period: 7.28 h 7.300±0.003 h 7.30517±0.00005 h
- Geometric albedo: 0.123±0.006; 0.196±0.033; 0.20 (assumed)
- Spectral type: S B–V = 0.990
- Absolute magnitude (H): 12.51 · 12.62±0.64 · 12.75 · 12.81

1709 Ukraina, provisional designation 1925 QA, is a stony asteroid from the inner regions of the asteroid belt, approximately 9 kilometers in diameter. It was discovered on 16 August 1925, by Soviet astronomer Grigory Shajn at Simeiz Observatory on the Crimean peninsula. It was named in honor of Ukraine.

== Orbit and classification ==
Ukraina orbits the Sun in the inner main-belt at a distance of 1.9–2.9 AU once every 3 years and 8 months (1,340 days). Its orbit has an eccentricity of 0.21 and an inclination of 8° with respect to the ecliptic.

The body's observation arc begins at Heidelberg, five days after its official discovery observation at Simeiz.

== Physical characteristics ==
The S-type asteroid has an albedo of about 0.2 and a rotation period of 7.3 hours.

== Naming ==
This minor planet was named after the country Ukraine, then the Ukrainian Soviet Socialist Republic (1922–1991). The name was proposed by the Institute of Theoretical Astronomy in Leningrad, what is now St. Petersburg. The official naming citation was published by the Minor Planet Center on 1 June 1967 (M.P.C. 2740).
