= Hotel Ukraine =

Hotel in Kyiv, Ukraine

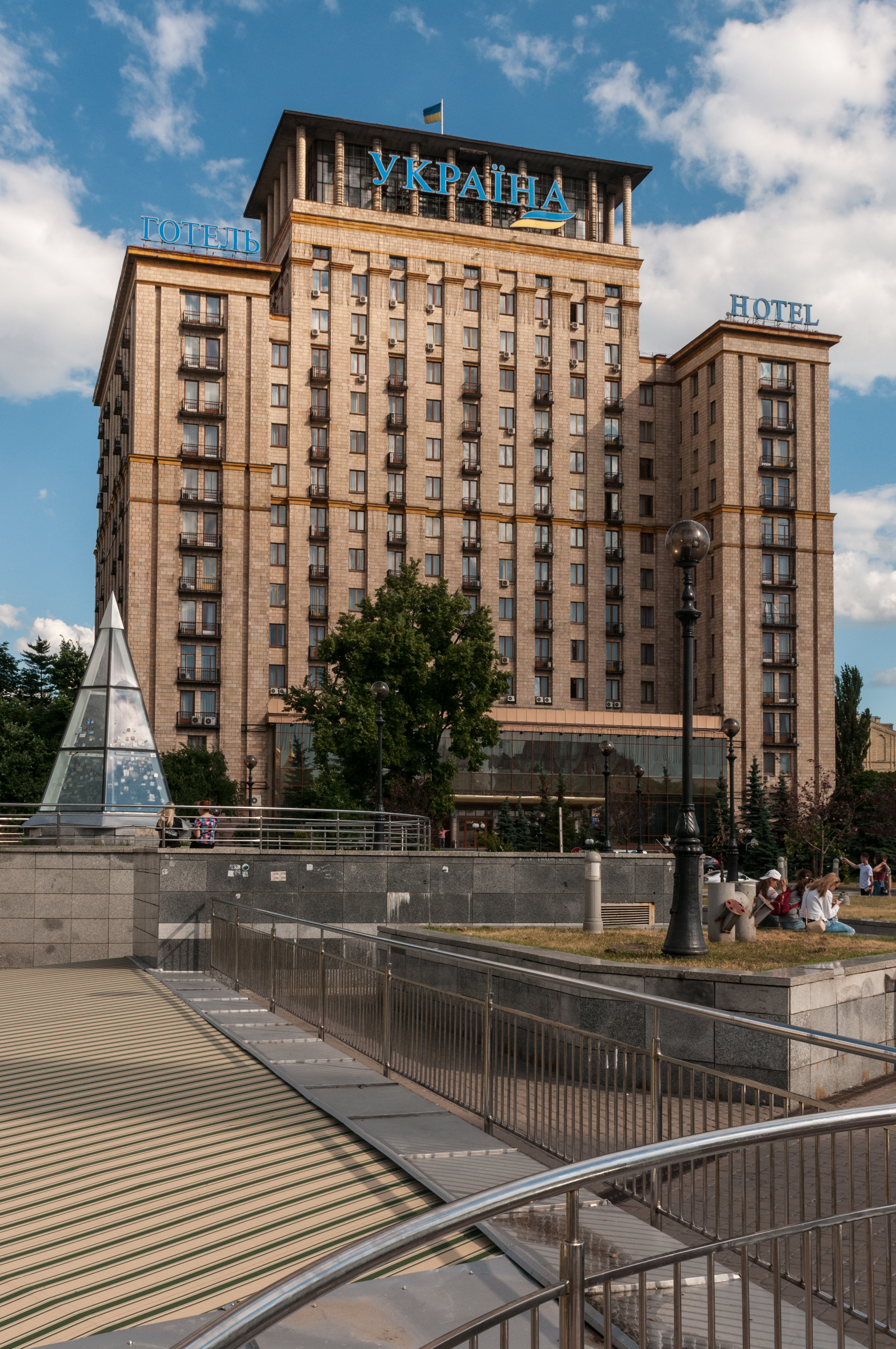

General information
- Location: Kyiv, Ukraine, Alley of Heroes of the Heavenly Hundred, 4
- Coordinates: 50°26′54.75″N 30°31′37.95″E
- Opening: 1961
- Owner: State Management of Affairs

Technical details
- Floor count: 21

Design and construction
- Architect: A. Dobrovolsky

Other information
- Number of rooms: 371
- Parking: 69

Website
- ukraine-hotel.kiev.ua/en/

Hotel Ukraine (Ukrainian: Готель Україна), also referred to as Hotel Ukraina or Hotel Ukrayina, is a four-star hotel located on the Alley of Heroes of the Heavenly Hundred in central Kyiv, the capital of Ukraine.

Designed under Stalin and Khrushchev as Hotel Moskva ('Hotel Moscow'), it opened in 1961 in a location which originally was occupied by Kyiv's first skyscraper, the Ginzburg House. The construction of the hotel finished the architectural ensemble of Kyiv's main street – the Khreshchatyk – which formed the post-war reconstruction of central Kyiv. It was renamed Hotel Ukraine in 2001, to celebrate the 10th anniversary of Ukraine's independence from the Soviet Union in 1991.

The hotel was under the jurisdiction of the State Administration of Affairs of Ukraine and was transferred to the jurisdiction of the Ministry of Infrastructure of Ukraine on December 28, 2021. Since April 2026, the hotel has been part of the ARS Capital investment holding company owned by Ukrainian businessman Maksym Krippa.

== Location history ==
The area of the location where the modern building sits is significant to the history of Kyiv and its geography. Historically, when Kyiv still had military fortification walls surrounding the city which ran along the modern Khreschatyk street and in the area of the Pechersk Gate, now located in today's Maidan Nezalezhnosti square. The layout of the roads leading to the gate can still be observed at the five small streets coming out of the northern part of the square.

Overlooking the Pechersk Gate from the south was an offspur of the Pechersk plateau with two roads on both sides linking the Pechersk with old Kyiv. One of which, modern Institutska Street, was known since days of Kievan Rus' as the Ivanovo road and the other (modern Horodetska) lead to a large market that was to the south. A beautiful Linden wood covered the surrounding hills forming a picturesque view from the city walls.

=== 19th century ===
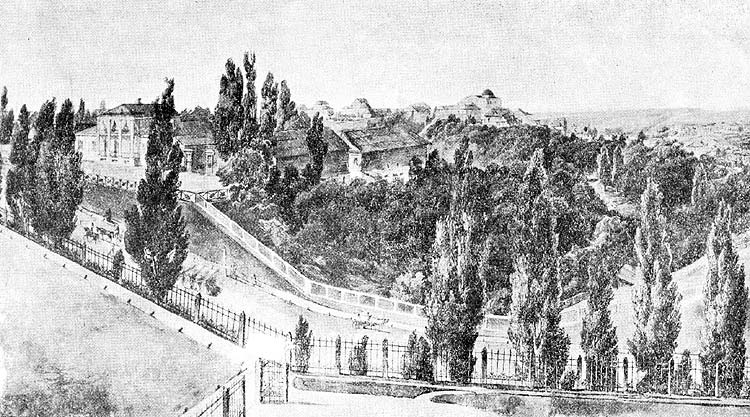
Berreti's House, 1850.

Eventually, the military fortification was pulled down, and as the 18th century drew to a close, development of the picturesque area quickly began turning the Ivanovo road into Ivanovskaya Street (renamed in the 1820s to Bigechevskaya when an estate of General Bigechev was constructed on it). At the same time, the other side of the offspur also received its share of development, and the Linden tree forest was transformed into a park with a lake (in the modern location of the Ivan Franko Square); all of this was inside the grounds of a massive estate that was bought in 1862 by Kyiv University professor of medicine Friedrich Mering. To gain additional profits, Mering allowed part of the park to be converted for the use of workshops and storage. When Mering died in 1895, his son Michael divided the estate for development into several quarters, due to the formation of the estate's service driveways. One of these driveways became the modern Olhinska street, which effectively placed the offspur in the geographical layout that survives today, with the Olhinska street cutting off the offspur in the south.

The remaining parts of the offspur, south of the Olhinska street did not receive a lot of development, as it was reserved in 1830 by the Governor of the Kiev Governorate Knyaz Levashov, who ordered the construction of a new Pechersk Fortress which would continue for almost twenty years. The construction would later be abandoned due to political instability in the Russian Empire. However, for the construction, some of Pechersk's residents had to be resettled (in all 1,180 households were demolished). Some of the resettling was directed towards the remaining Linden forest, which was deforested by the order of the governor. This area formed nowadays' most expensive city neighbourhoods: Lypky (from the Ukrainian translation of Lindens "Липки").

However the offspur itself did not receive a lot of development due to the lack of space, and as a result, some of the Linden trees still existed for a long time afterwards. In particular, Ukrainian poet Taras Shevchenko documented:

"My flat was directly across from the institute, not on the Kreshchatik, but on a hill. I offered it to Sofia Samoilovna and myself settled in architect Beretti's house."

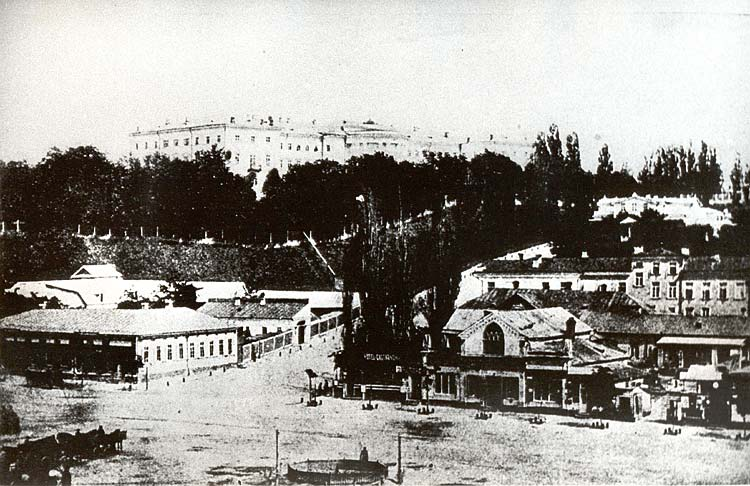
Mid-19th century.

The flat that Shevchenko describes was in a one-floor wooden house with a Mezzanine which was built by architect Alexander V. Beretti on Instutska 14, in the early 1840s. It is probable that sometime later, this house was either demolished or rebuilt before being replaced by a different building that survived to the period of World War II, and this is confirmed by F. Ernst in his 1930 travel guide "Kyiv":

"...25-ho Zhovtnya street (Insititutska) №14: A small wooden house in three floors height, externally decorated with yellow ochre. Nearby [up the hill] is a house that appeared like a cottage (№ 16), built by the famous Kievan architect Aleksandr Vikentievich Beretti (1816-1895). Selling it he later settled in the present wooden building. On the place of the cottage, now stands the mighty skyscraper (Ginzburg house). The wooden house (№ 14) is barely standing and inside is a hall with interesting pilasters."

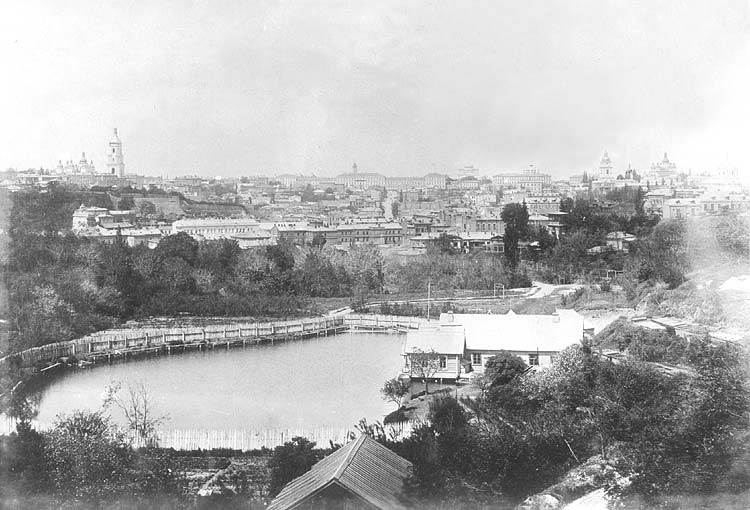
View from the Linden park back towards Khreshchatyk, latter half of the 19th century.

But only three years later, both mansions on Instituska 16 and 18 are transferred to the famous Kyivan contractor L. Ginzburg. Thus he becomes an owner of almost 34 square kilometres (13 mi^{2}) of land between the Mykolaevska (modern Horodetska) and Institute streets. In 1901, under the project of architect Shleif, a six-story building was constructed on Mykolaevska-9 and built into the new mansion complex. The building still stands today, though badly damaged in 1941, it has lost some of its original decor following post-war restorations.

Indeed, in 1884, the mansion of Instituska 16 was bought by a military engineer, Colonel M. Fabritsius. He ordered architect A. Gekker to create a project for a new house, but being not satisfied, he self-planned an original in pseudo-Mauritanian style mansion (destroyed in 1941). In 1886, Fabritsius widened his land by buying a neighbouring plot (Institutska 18) and building a new four-story house there.

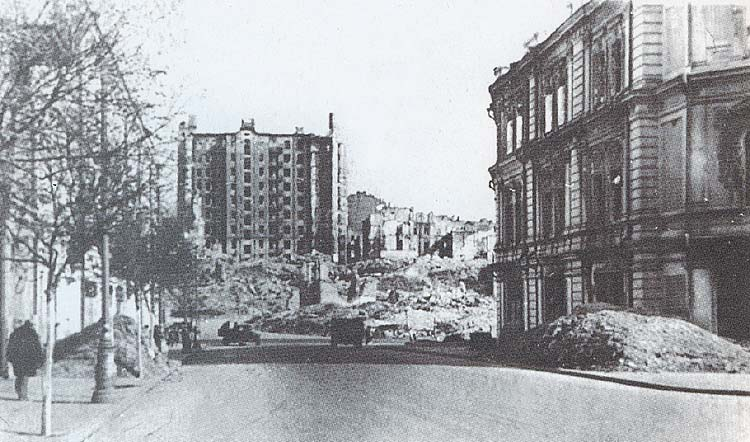
The destroyed Ginzburg House.

== World War II and city reconstruction ==
Like all of central Kyiv, the Ginzburg house was to have the same fate as the rest of the buildings when after the Red Army's abandoning of the city remote explosives were employed to detonate and blow up the central city. Ginzburg house was not totally destroyed but remained as a ruined shell.

After Kyiv's liberation, during the cleanup of the streets and squares of the city from the ruins the remaining part of the Ginzburg house were pulled down. Symbolically on 22 June 1944 the City Council called for a competition for architects from Kyiv as well as other places from the republic and the union to develop a new project for a complete reconstruction of the central city. Most of them had provisions to place a new tall building on the place of the original Ginzburg house. The 1937 opinion of Alexander Dovzhenko about the Ginzburg house that all likewise constructions of Kyiv should be based on its geographical relief, was echoed in almost every project.

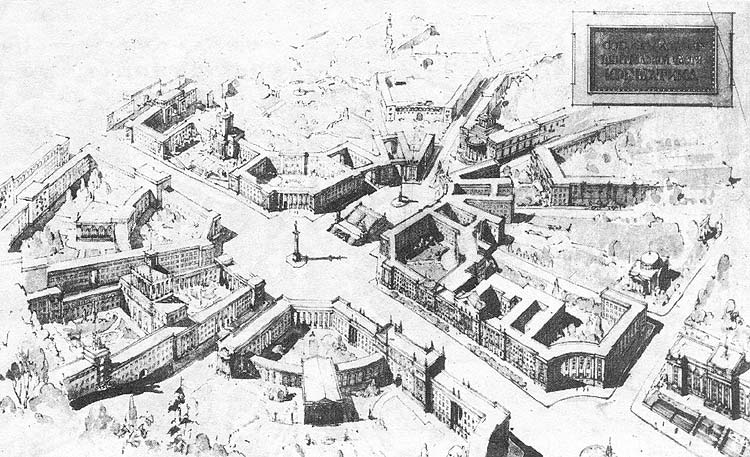
Reconstruction of central Kyiv (One of the 22 rejected projects).

Not a single of the original projects, despite that that many were submitted in the long three-phase part was realized. The competition dragged on for several years and eventually the organisers gave the development of the general reconstruction project of central Kyiv to the first workshop of the institute "Kievprojekt".

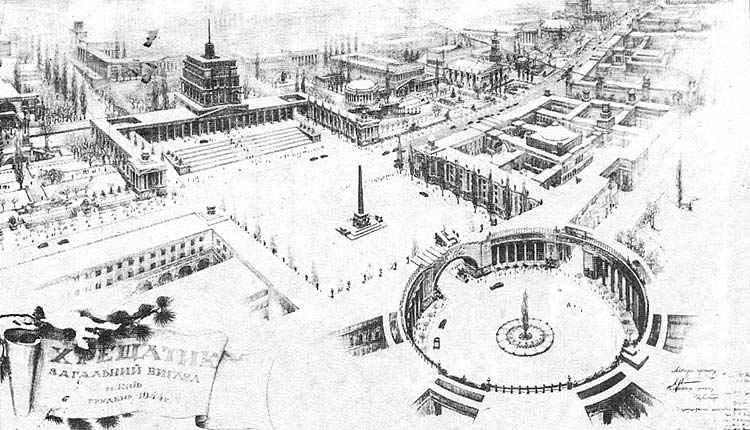
Another rejected project.

== Selected hotel design (1948); preparations ==
Thus the modern hotel building dates to 1948 when a joint group of architects headed by the chief Architect of Kyiv Aleksandr Vlasov and included A.Dobrovolsky, A.Malinovsky, V.Elizarova, B.Priymaka, A.Zavarova amongst many others. However, in 1949 Dobrovolsky took the position of the head after Vlasov moved to Moscow.

In the early 1950s, the remaining rubble of the Ginzburg house was removed, along with the old foundation, on the edge of the plateau, and the empty space was slowly prepared for the future high rise hotel. Construction of the building finalized by the architects A.Doborvolsky, V.Priymak, A.Miletsky, A.Kosenko and V.Sazansky began in 1954. By this point, construction was also underway in the rebuilding of the Khreschatyk and the, renamed in 1946, Kalinin Square opposite the offspur.

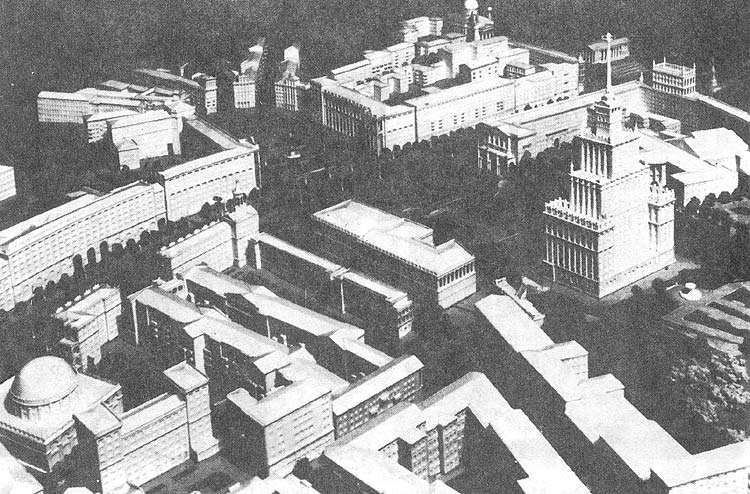
Selected design as finalised by architect A. Dobrovolsky.

The original hotel was to be based much on Moscow's seven sisters that were built during that time. The finalised project featured an I shaped building with the central part towering over the two wings and topped with a decorative spire and a red star. A massive neo-classic foundation would serve as an entrance, and from the top, a viewing platform would be installed so that visitors can see the whole of Kyiv.

== Khrushchev reform: politics and architecture ==
After the death of Joseph Stalin, Nikita Khrushchev firmly secured his position in Moscow. With the destalinisation programme in full swing the Soviet State re-prioritised its main objectives. One of the biggest problems was construction of housing, which despite being ten years since the end of the war, was much too slow with millions of people still living in communal flats. Faced with the dilemma in 1955 Khrushchev issued a decree, that initiated what became later known as the "struggle with decorative extras". In short it meant that rich exquisite features such as colonnades, sculptures, pilasters and other central features of Stalinist Architecture were not to be used. Although this was primarily addressed at housing, nonetheless, its impact found itself into projects that were already developed and in construction.

== Changed design for square and hotel ==
For central Kyiv this had a full impact on the final stage of its reconstruction. The original project of Dobrovolsky was abandoned, which upon the late 1950s was mostly complete, with the exception of the northeastern side of the Kalinin square. Construction was stopped, and the square, for almost two decades looked very odd with the asymmetry formed from the rich Stalinist buildings on the north and the old pre-war, and pre-revolution constructions opposite.

However, none of the impacts of the "struggle" were as visual as the final fate of the Hotel Moskva itself. In 1954 construction began on the empty space on top of the flattened remnants of the offspur following the clean-up of the Ginzburg house rubble in the late 1940s. Yet for a medium-sized building in 1955 construction was put on hold, then continued, but under a much slower rate. The design came under repeated waves of criticisms in light of Khrushchev's decree on the highest Republic level. As a result, with the carcass of the structure already rising, the architects were commissioned to alter the design in the most obscure ways possible. First came the rich foundation "grote" then the colonnade enriched entrance, replaced by a glazed lobby. In external decoration none of the small sculptures or bas-reliefs survived. Yet even at that the assault did not stop. The politicians, going against all principles, attacked the whole top of the building, not only the spire, but the crowning five floor pedestal that the spire sat on, effectively halving the final height.

As a result, the hotel, with its mutilated design that should have, with respect to the original decree, accelerated and rationalised its rate of construction, was opened only in 1961, seven years after construction began. The massive Moscow State University which was thrice as big was finished in only four years 1949-1953, i.e. almost twice as fast. The new building, originally meant to be an elite hotel, much like the Ginzburg house before it became an eyesore. Moreover, the transition from Stalinist Architecture was so rapid, that by the time of its opening, the architectural changes of the 1960s, inspired by the Space Age and new technology made it simply archaic. Dobrovolsky later wrote:

This object was born out of sorrows and hardships, with more than twenty individual projects that were developed, each one in turn passing the government in face of never-ending criticism. It is not surprising that the silhouette of the building reminds of the high rises that were erected at the time in Moscow. Back then it could not have been different, because projecting one of the most responsible buildings had direct state interest.

Hotel Moscow upon completion in 1961

Nonetheless, even in such conditions we tried to maximise our artistic individuality, made many attempts to use traditional motifs of the past. I think that the architectural practice of those times was saved by the high level of professionality of the people designing it. However this proved powerless against the direct intervention of politics into architecture. I remember that night, when the member of the Ukrainian government I.Senin called me and, with extreme sadness in his voice, told about the government session that just closed. Nothing could be done, the building must be cut by five floors. Later I was told that Nikita Khrushchev, during one of his visits to Kiev asked what happened to Hotel Moskva, and after seeing that this is how the "struggle with decorative extras" is being conducted, with pity said that unique constructions are not affected by that decree and only housing property, and what happened here was just like in the old saying "make a fool pray and instead he breaks his forehead".

Another author of the project, B. Priymak, also stated that "the hotel had to have a powerful strength, show the picturesque natural landscape of Kiev, towering high above the Kreschatik. Realisation of the projected design would have allowed to enrich the composition of the main square of the capital".

In particular it was this argument that was repeated from Kyiv's architects that came throughout the 1960s and 1970s. They, in unison, stressed that the building should be completed in stand-alone fashion, maybe not Stalinist, but at least its form should be such as to constitute a visually pleasing landmark for Kyiv, rather than an eyesore. In the 1980s however, even as the Kalinin Square (by then renamed October Revolution Square) finally did obtain the full symmetric look that was originally projected, the reconstruction of Hotel Moskva deemed too complex to be then carried out.

== Post-independence ==
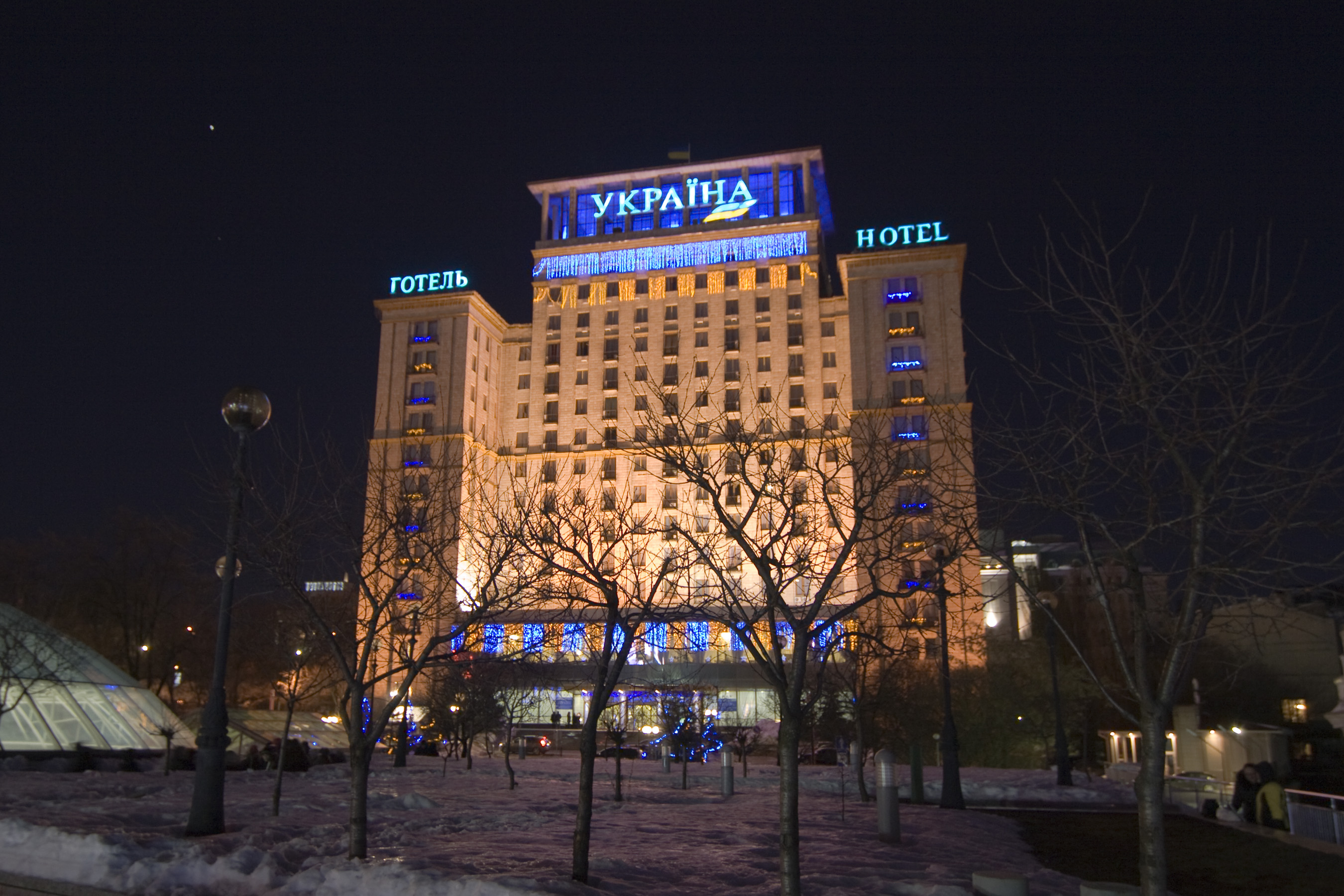
Hotel Ukraine at night, 2013.

In 2001, it was rebranded as Hotel "Ukrayina", in honour of the 10th anniversary of the independence of Ukraine. The Bridge over Instytutska Street was opened in 2002, giving pedestrians easy access between Hotel Ukraine and the October Palace.

The hotel became a vantage point for journalists covering the Euromaidan in 2013 and the Revolution of Dignity the following year. When part of Instytutska Street was renamed to the Alley of Heroes of the Heavenly Hundred on 30 January 2015, Hotel Ukraine's address changed accordingly.

Previously, the hotel was state-owned, belonging to the State Management of Affairs of Ukraine. On April 23, 2024, it was included in the list of state-owned properties subject to large-scale privatisation by the Cabinet of Ministers of Ukraine. In September 2024, the hotel was privatized and auctioned off to businessman Maksym Krippa for ₴2.5 billion. On October 30, 2024, the State Property Fund of Ukraine reported that the new owner ("Ola Fine LLC") had paid ₴2.51 billion into the budget. The new owner announced plans to implement a business project once the war ends. He mentioned opening a luxury hotel or another project as one of the options.

On 24 May 2026, the hotel sustained damage during a missile attack from the Russo-Ukrainian War, but maintained operations.

== See also ==
- List of hotels in Kyiv
- Stalinist skyscrapers, overview list: "Seven Sisters" in Moscow and similar ones elsewhere
- Ginsburg Skyscraper
