= Ukraina, Lesser Poland Voivodeship =

Ukraina
- Village
- Location within Poland
- Coordinates: 49°45′53″N 21°8′11″E
- Country: Poland
- Voivodeship: Lesser Poland
- County: Gorlice
- Gmina: Biecz

Ukraina [ukraˈina] is a village in the administrative district of Gmina Biecz, within Gorlice County, Lesser Poland Voivodeship, in southern Poland.
