= Khrennikov House =

Building in Dnipro, Ukraine

Coordinates: 48°27′55″N 35°2′37″E

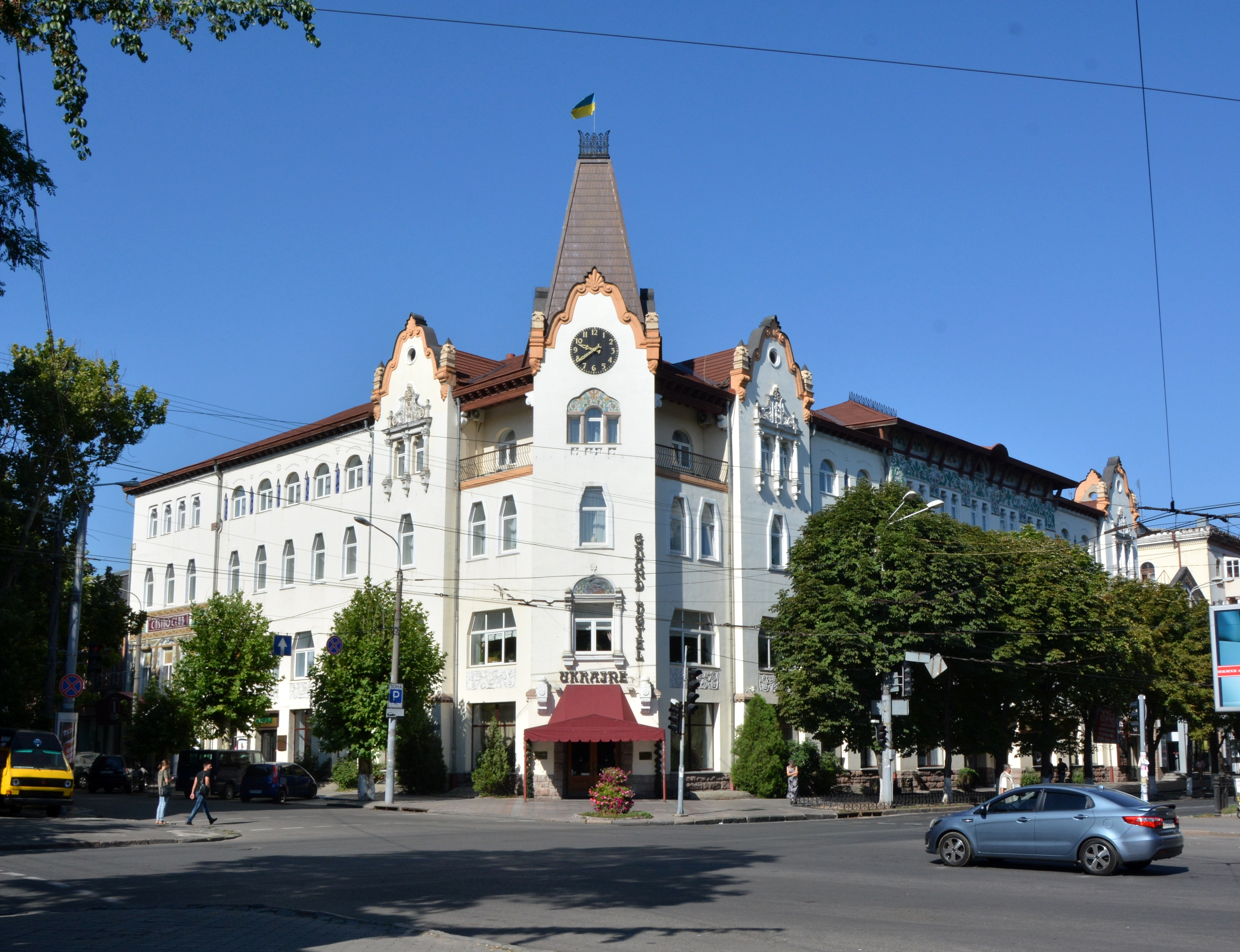
The Khrennikov House, main facade

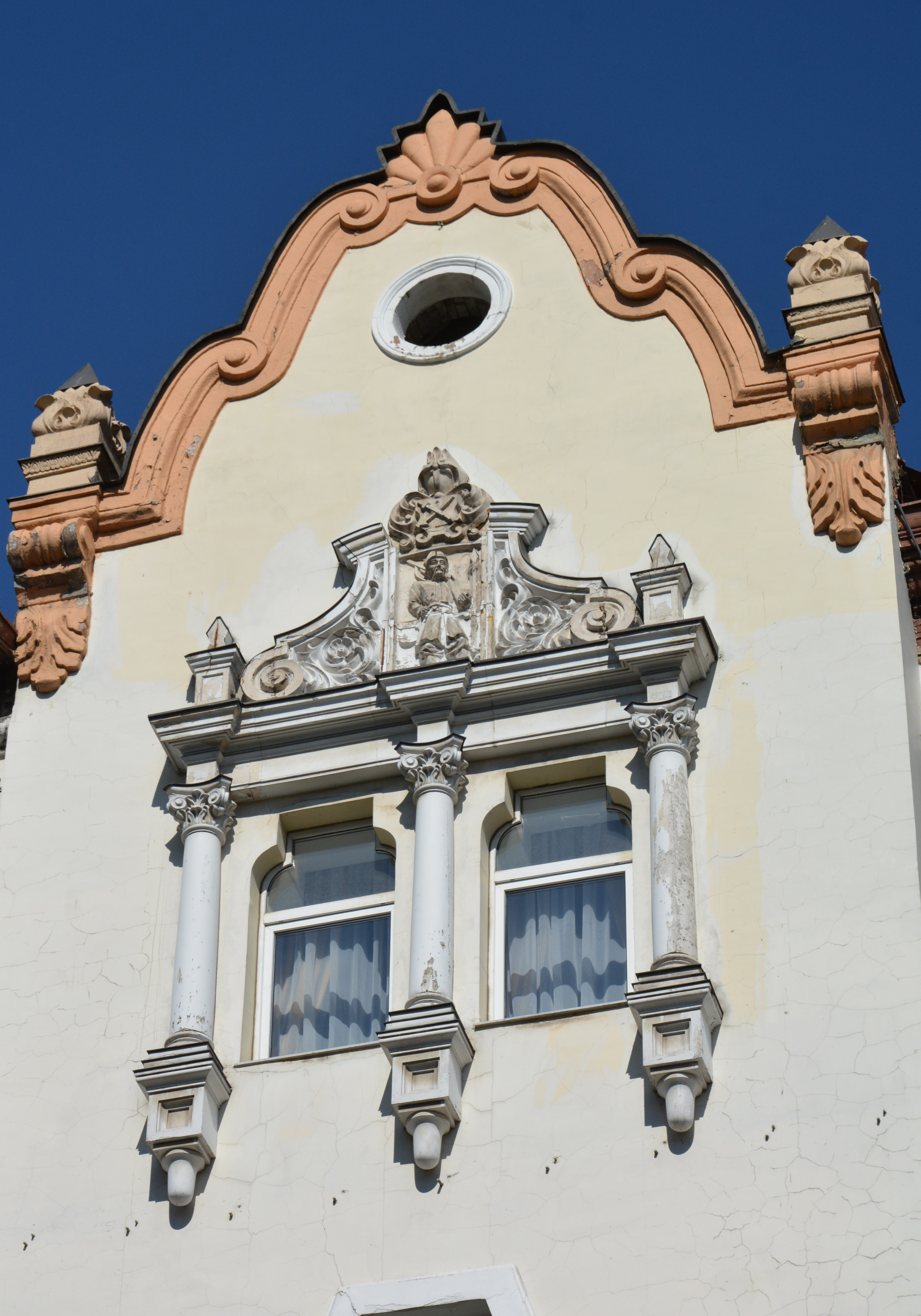
The top part of one of the facades

The Khrennikov House (Ukrainian: Будинок Хреннікова, romanized: Budynok Khrennikova) is a four-floor building in Dnipro (formerly Yekaterinoslav), one of the best examples of the Art Nouveau architecture in the city. It is located at the corner of Dmytra Yavornytskoho Avenue and Korolenko Street and currently houses Grand Hotel Ukraina.

== History ==
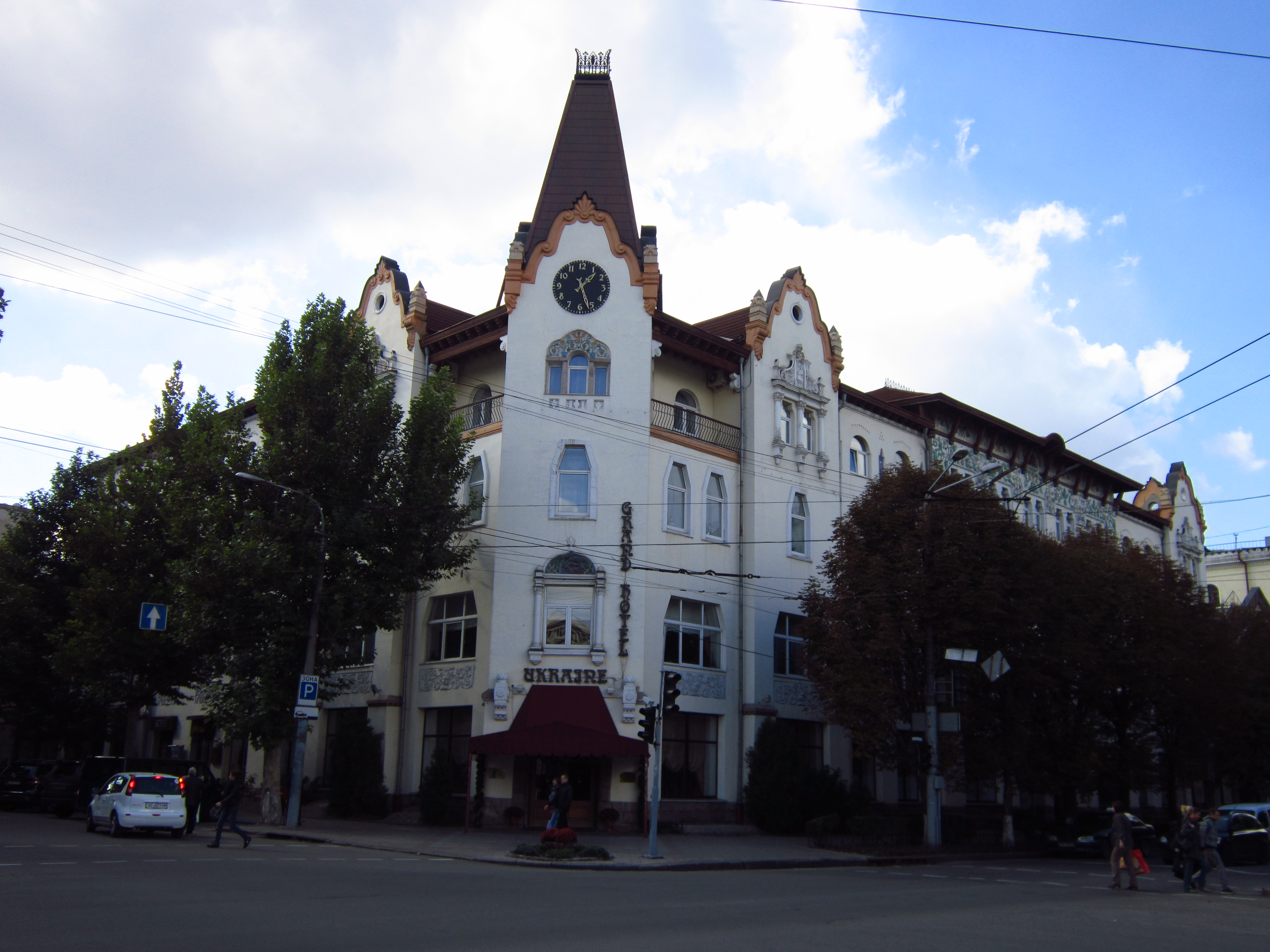
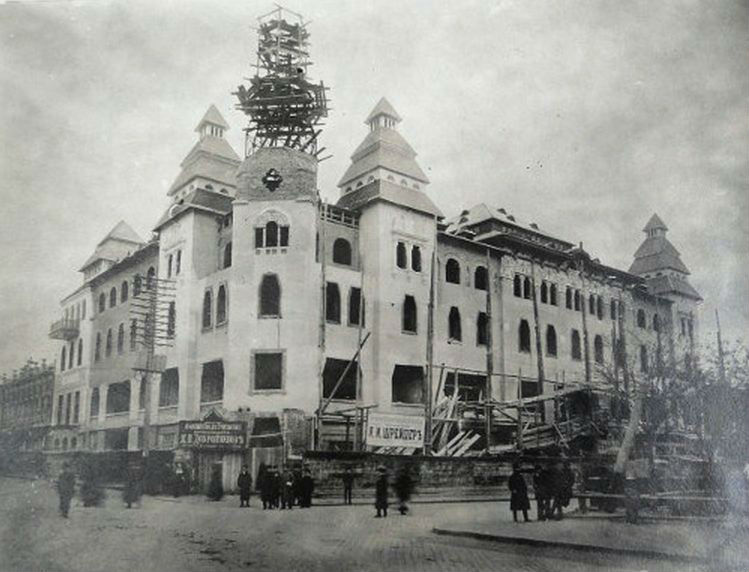
The building in 2013 and in 1913.

The house was completed in 1913. The estate owner and engineer Vladimir Khrennikov hired a young architect Pyotr Fetisov to develop the project. Another architect, Lyudomir-Flavian Khoynovsky, also participated. The idea to build a house in a traditional Ukrainian style belonged to a historian Dmytro Yavornytsky, who lived in Yekaterinoslav and knew Khrennikov.

Vladimir Khrennikov was the son of merchant Nikolay Khrennikov and Lyubov Belyavskaya, a daughter of merchant Prokofy Belyavsky, who on two occasions was elected the mayor of Yekaterinoslav. Khrennikov inherited the estate from his mother. He graduated from Imperial Petersburg Institute of Technology and travelled around Europe before returning to Yekaterinoslav at around 1905. The estate where the house is not standing was occupied by trading arcades built before 1870 by Belyavsky. Khrennikov, who was a sympathisant of Ukrainian national movement, decided to demolish the trading arcades and to build a revenue house in the Ukrainian Art Nouveau style. The construction lasted between 1910 and 1913; in parallel, one of the renters of the old building refused to move out and had to be sued. The new rental agreements started from 1 January 1914. In 1914, a cinema was opened in the building, and the lower floors were occupied by shops and warehouses. The upper floors were in 1915 rented to the Emperor Nicholas II First Commercial School, which had its own building used for a military hospital. The room was insufficient for the school, which had to cut a number of incoming students.

The building has a complicated shape with a central tower with a spire looking at the street crossing. The walls are white, except for two large paintings made of maiolica. There are many details, including arches and windows, which are clearly inspired by real or imaginary architecture of the Zaporizhian Sich.

In 1918, after the October Revolution Khrennikov left the city, abandoning all of his properties. He remained in Russia and died in Kislovodsk in 1936. After 1920, the building housed the Central District Committee of the Communist Party, a central statistical office, a club, and an art museum, as well as a number of state and commercial organizations. The house was considerably damaged during World War II. In the 1950s, it was restored, and the hotel was housed in the building.
