= Ukrainian Church =

Ukrainian Church may refer to:

== Currently existing churches ==
=== Orthodox churches ===
- Orthodox Church of Ukraine, also called Ukrainian Orthodox Church (December 15, 2018–), established by a union of the UOC-KP, UAOC, and some members of the UOC-MP
- Ukrainian Orthodox Church – Kyiv Patriarchate (UOC-KP) (1992–December 15, 2018; 20 June 2019–), which reestablished its independence by declaring itself independent from the Orthodox Church of Ukraine on 20 June 2019 after a conflict within the OCU
- Ukrainian Orthodox Church (Moscow Patriarchate) (1990–), an autonomous church under jurisdiction of the Russian Orthodox Church
- Ukrainian Autocephalous Orthodox Church Canonical (1924–)
- Ukrainian Orthodox Church of Canada, under jurisdiction of the Ecumenical Patriarchate of Constantinople
- Ukrainian Orthodox Church of the USA, under jurisdiction of the Ecumenical Patriarchate of Constantinople
- Ukrainian Orthodox Vicariate Sighetu Marmației, a vicariate of the Romanian Orthodox Church serving Eastern Orthodox believers from Romania's Ukrainian community

=== Catholic churches ===
- Ukrainian Greek Catholic Church, an Eastern Catholic church of the Byzantine Rite, centered in Ukraine
- Ukrainian Orthodox Greek Catholic Church (2008–), an independent Ukrainian Greek Catholic Church that was established from the official Ukrainian Greek Catholic Church, which self-identifies as both Orthodox and Catholic
- Catholic Church in Ukraine, incorporating all communities and institutions of the Catholic Church in Ukraine

== Historical Churches ==
=== Orthodox churches ===
- For the Orthodox church in Ukraine before the 20th century, see: List of metropolitans and patriarchs of Kyiv.
- Ukrainian Autonomous Orthodox Church (1941–44), a short-lived Ukrainian church that existed when Ukraine was occupied by Nazi Germany during the Second World War
- Renovationism (May 1922–July 26, 1946), an independent liberal church
- Ukrainian Autocephalous Orthodox Church (1922–December 15, 2018), dissolved itself to form the Orthodox Church of Ukraine

== See also ==
- Christianity in Ukraine
- History of Christianity in Ukraine
