= Serbian True Orthodox Church =

Eastern-orthodox church in Serbia

- Српска истинска православна црква Srpska istinska pravoslavna crkva
- Type: Eastern Orthodox
- Classification: Independent Eastern Orthodox
- Orientation: True Orthodox
- Primate: Bishop Akakije (Stankovic)
- Language: Serbian
- Headquarters: Ralja near Belgrade
- Territory: Serbia
- Independence: 1996
- Separated from: Serbian Orthodox Church
- Members: 350-700+ (2010–14)
- Official website: serbiantrueorthodox.blogspot.com

The Serbian True Orthodox Church (STOC; Serbian: Српска истинска православна црква, СИПЦ, Srpska istinska pravoslavna crkva, SIPC) is a denomination that separated from the larger Serbian Orthodox Church in 1996. Its founder and current leader is bishop Akakije (Stankovic). The members refer to themselves as revnitelji ('consistent', 'persistent'); they are informally called ziloti ('zealots') by the public. The church is part of the traditionalist True Orthodox movement, a loose group of independent Orthodox churches which oppose ecumenism and other attempts of modernization within the mainstream Eastern Orthodox Church.

== History ==
The Serbian True Orthodox Church originated in the 1990s, when three Serb monks returned from the Esphigmenou Monastery on Mount Athos, a stronghold of Greek Old Calendarists. Among them was Nemanja Stanković, who later took the church name Akakije (Acacius). In 1996 Akakije returned to Serbia and established a monk community on Fruška Gora, near Nova Ravanica monastery. The movement follows the Old Calendarist doctrines of rejecting all perceived attempts at reform of the church, particularly ecumenism and other relations with non-Orthodox Christians, baptism by aspersion and acceptance of the Revised Julian Calendar.

As of 2014, the number of followers of the church is estimated to be several hundred. In a 2010 interview, Eugenia, the hegumenia of Novi Stjenik monastery stated that "there is 350 of us, but the number of sympathizers is much larger".

The relationships of the STOC and the mainstream Serbian Orthodox Church (SOC) have been tense. The SOC considers the members of the church to be "schismatics, fundamentalists and heretics". In an article in Svetosavlje, the official magazine of the SOC, bishop Atanasije Jevtić analyzed the history and theology of the STOC, refuting their "theological blunders", as he puts it.

=== Churches and monasteries ===
In 2007, the sisterhood of Stjenik Monastery near Čačak refused submission to the Serbian Orthodox Church after it signed the Ecumenic Charter agreeing to hold a great Christian Communion in Niš in 2013. After they were expelled from the monastery, they founded a new one, called "Novi Stjenik", in the remote Kučaj mountains in eastern Serbia. In 2010, the monastery had thirteen nuns.

A former weekend house on Fruška Gora was turned into a male monastery, called "Church of Saint Cyril and Metodius". As of 2010, the monastery had three monks.

Since 2012, the STOC has been building a church of Utešiteljevo near Ralja, south of Belgrade. The church is its formal episcopal seat.

All STOC monasteries and churches hoist a black flag with the inscription "Orthodoxy or death!".

== Child camp controversy ==
In August 2014, the STOC organized the second "Saint Lazar Orthodox Youth Camp" on the Kučaj mountains, that gathered a number of 12- to 18-year-olds. They came to the attention of the Serbian public after it was revealed that the children were taught how to operate airsoft replicas of Kalashnikov rifles, among other military skills. The organizers were criticized for child recruitment and child abuse. Bishop Akakije and Efrosinija, hegumenia of the Novi Stjenik monastery, stated that the camp was organized by a model of similar camps in Russia, as well as scouting camps worldwide, that the children were taught outdoor survival skills and self-defense, and the shooting training was only one day of a 10-day course. The police and the public prosecutor of the city of Bor began an investigation of the case.
