= Slovak Catholic Church =

Slovak Catholic Church may refer to:

- Catholic Church in Slovakia, incorporating all communities and institutions of the Catholic Church in Slovakia
- Slovak Greek Catholic Church, an Eastern Catholic church of the Byzantine Rite, centered in Slovakia
- Slovak Old-Catholic Church, an Old Catholic Church in Slovakia

== See also ==
- Slovak Church (disambiguation)
