= Constitution Square, Kyiv =

Square in Kyiv, Ukraine

Coordinates: 50°26′49.40″N 30°33′15.25″E

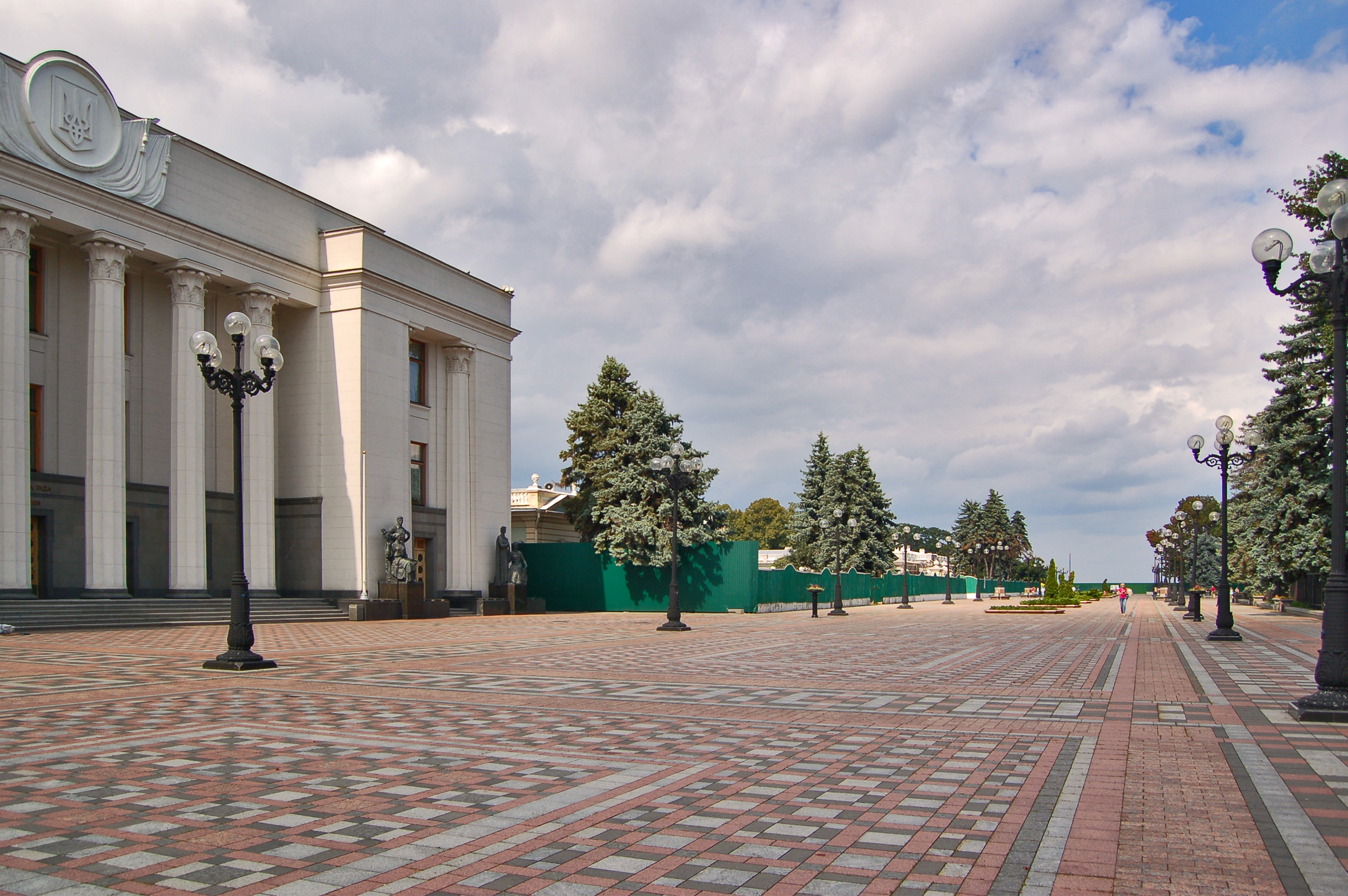
Constitution Square

Constitution Square (Ukrainian: Площа Конституції, Ploshcha Konstytutsii) is a square restricted to pedestrians only and located in the very center of Kyiv city, Pechersk neighborhood of the Pechersk Raion.

== Constitution Square ==
The square is elongated, stretching from vulytsia Mykhaila Hrushevskoho (Hrushevsky Street) towards the Dnieper's sloping banks. On the northern side of the square is an ensemble of two government buildings consisting of the Verkhovna Rada building and the Mariinskyi Palace, while on its southern side is Mariinskyi Park. Just past the Palace, Constitution Square ends.

Constitution Square was known since the building of the Mariinskiy Palace in 1750. Until 1854, administrative buildings were located here, in addition to the square being used for military parades and training. In 1847, Mariinskyi Park was established next to it. The first recorded name for the square, Dvortsovskaya ploshchad (Palace Square), appeared in 1869.

Sometime in 1930s, the square's name was changed to TsVK USSR Square (after the Central Executive Committee of Ukraine), and in 1940 it was renamed to October Square. After the World War II it was known as the Verkhovna Rada Square. In 1977, the square was renamed Soviet Square.

After the fall of the Soviet Union, the Ukrainian government did not prioritise renaming the square. It was not until 2012 when the square was officially and legally renamed to its current name, the Constitution Square.
