= Mariinskyi Park =

Park in Kyiv, Ukraine

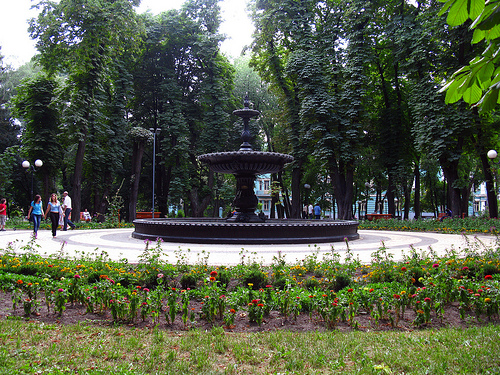
- Fountain in Mariinskyi Park
- Interactive map of Mariinskyi Park
- Type: public city park
- Location: Pechersk Raion
- Nearest city: Kyiv
- Coordinates: 50°26′49″N 30°32′23″E
- Created: 1847
- Etymology: Mariinskyi Palace
- Status: Monument of Garden Artistry
- IUCN category III (natural monument or feature)

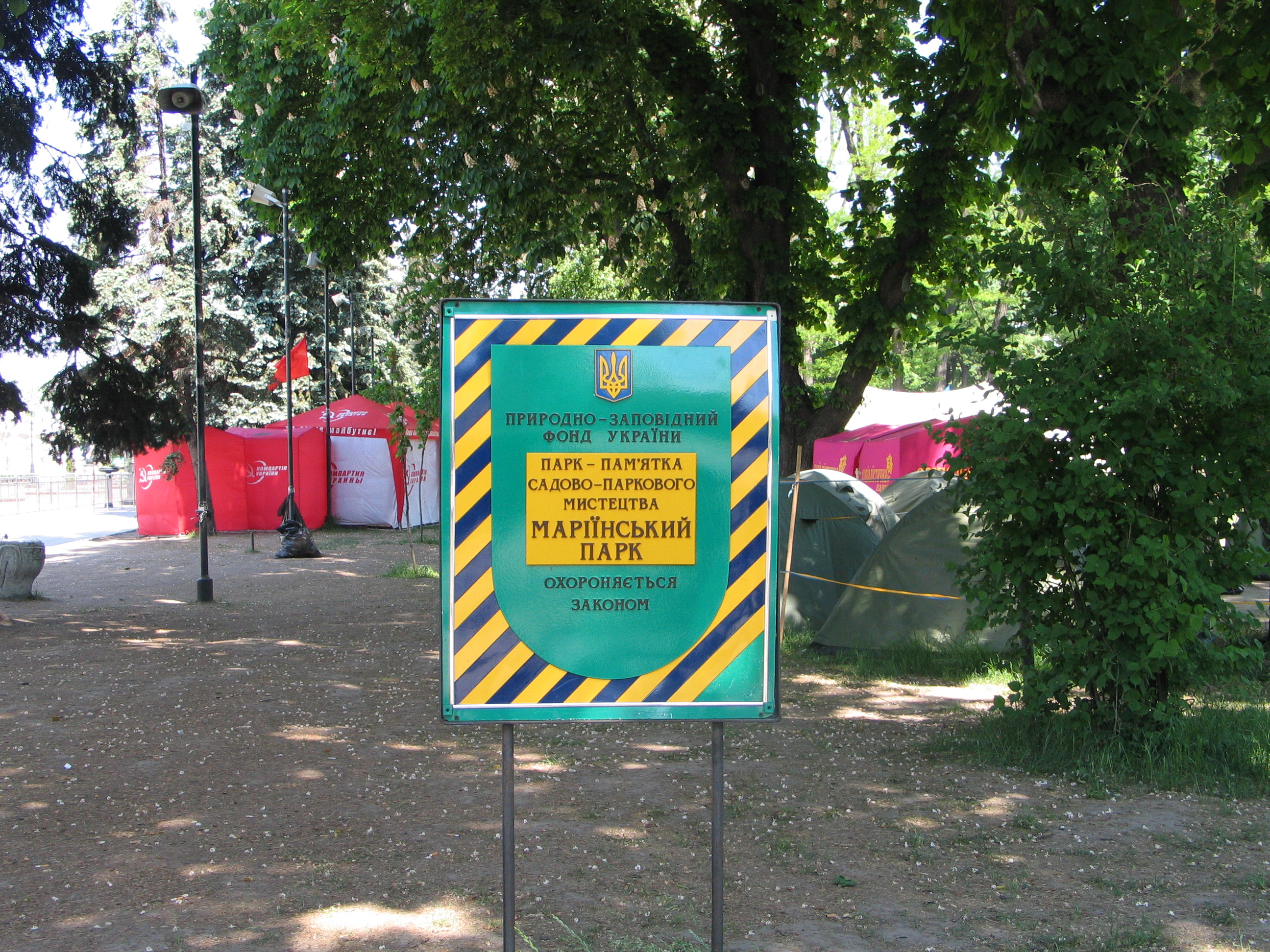
Information sign about the park

Mariinskyi Park (Ukrainian: Маріїнський парк) is a park located in Pechersk neighborhood in front of the Supreme Council of Ukraine (Constitution Square), Hrushevsky Street, and Park Road. The park is also a Soviet necropolis. The park is recognized as part of the Nature Preservation Fund of Ukraine, yet its official listing is not known.

== Mariinskyi park ==
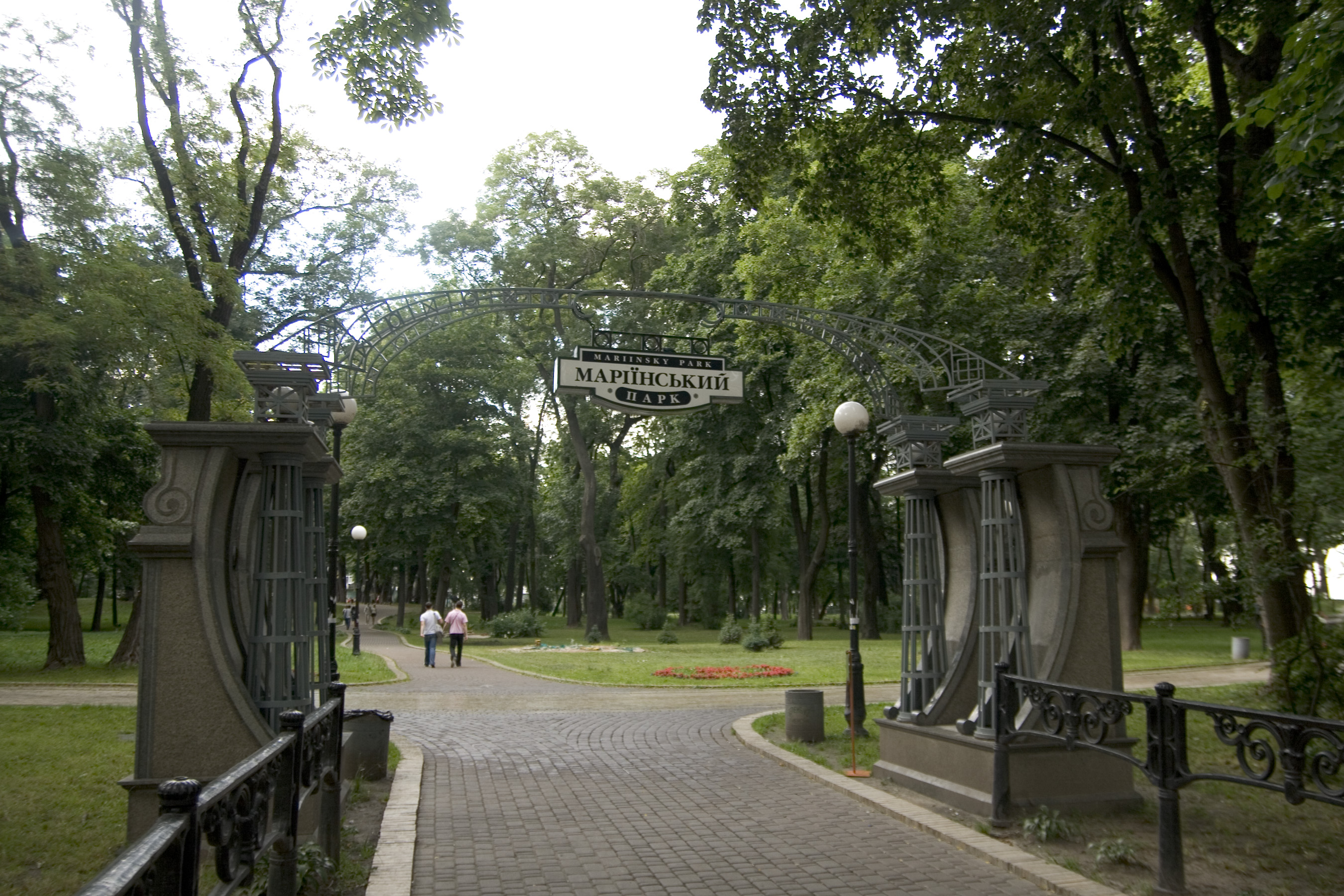
Entrance to the park

The park is around 130 years old. It received its name from the nearby Mariinskyi Palace. Mariinskyi Park was founded in 1874 near central entrance of the Palace and the money for its foundation were budgeted by the wife of the Alexander II of Russia Maria Alexandrovna (Marie of Hesse). The appearance of the park changed a lot since that time. For example, at the end of the 19th-century marble busts and sculptures were erected along the alley. In 1900 cast iron fountain was established and it is still there.

At first, the park was called "Tsarskyi" (imperial), but after the revolution this name was inappropriate and it was changed into Mariinskyi. But the park had other names as well. In different periods of its history, it was called Park of the victims of the revolution, Proletarian park and Soviet park. In the 1970s – 1980s children's railway was functioning in the park. The last great reconstruction of Mariinskyi park took place in 2000.

== Location ==
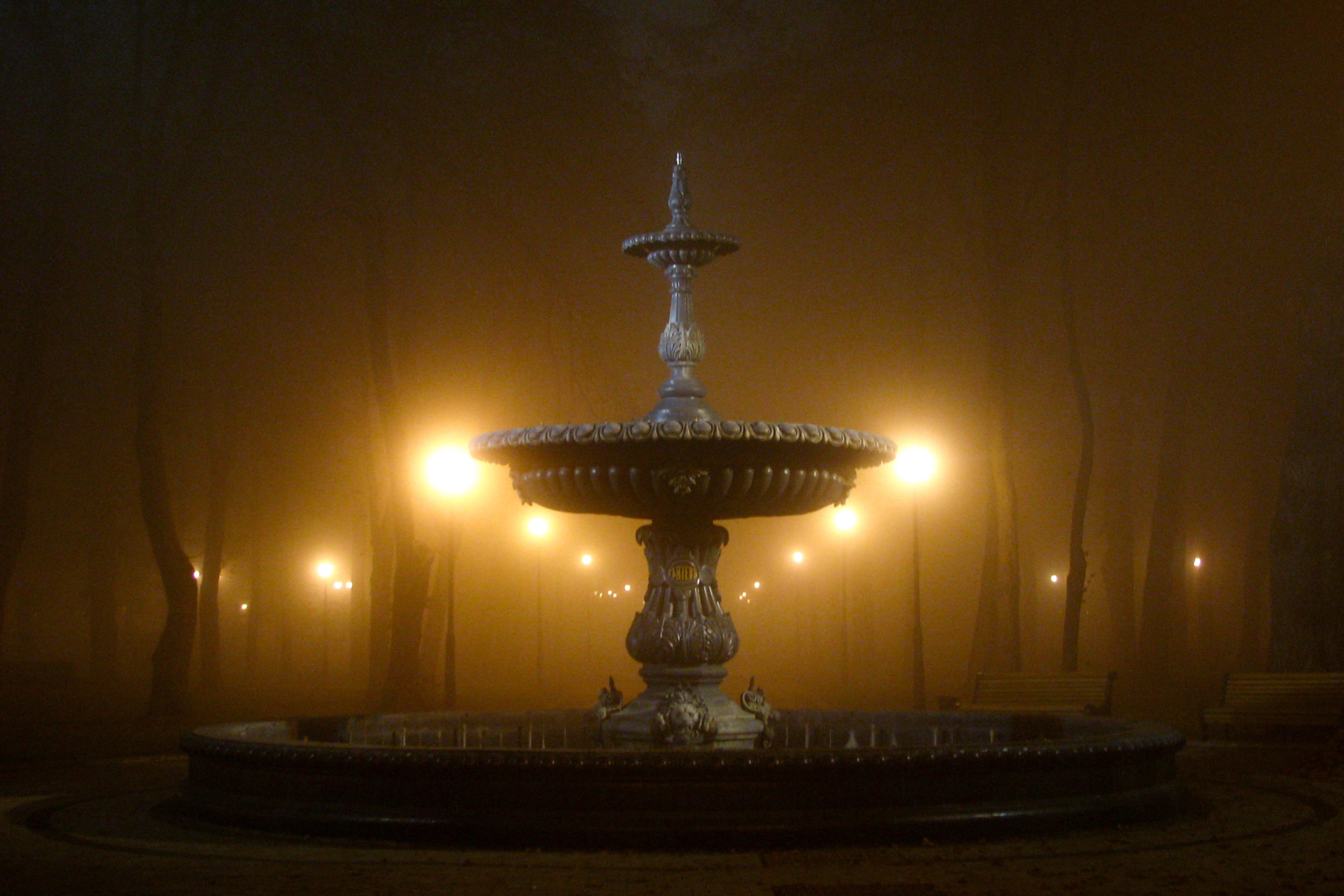
Fountain in Mariinskyi park

Park is located in the Pechersk Raion of Kyiv next to important government institutions such as the Parliament's building which is separated from the park by ploshcha Konstytutsii (Constitution Square). The Constitution Square is rather elongated and serves as the park's northwestern border. It runs perpendicular to vulytsia Mykhaila Hrushevskoho (Hrushevsky Street) which is the park's southwestern border. To the southeast the park is cut off by vulytsia Merezhka (Merezhko Street) and row of residential multi-story buildings. On the northeast side of the park towards Dnieper's shores runs Parkova doroha (Park Road).

Within the Mariinskyi Park is located a complex of government administration buildings that belongs to the Ministry of Health Care. To the north from the park along the Park Road are located building of a former hospital for chronically sick children and a big heliport.

== Buildings ==
- administrative buildings of Ministry of Healthcare
- Church of Alexander Nevsky (not preserved)

== Monuments ==
- Heroes of October Revolution
- Participants of January Uprising
- Headstone at Andriy Ivanov's grave
- Blossomed chestnuts monument

=== Former monuments ===
- Nikolai Vatutin monument Dismantled on 9 February 2023.

== Graves ==
- Andriy Ivanov
- Nikolai Vatutin
- Red Guards and Bolsheviks mass grave (who participated the Ukrainian-Soviet War) killed by the Ukrainian Central Rada
- mass grave of 42 victims of Denikin's repressions (Ivan Fyodorovich Smirnov, Vasyl Chumak)
- mass grave of Kyiv defenders executed by Bolsheviks (during the Ukrainian-Soviet War)

According to the Ukrainian Institute of National Memory the exact location of the burials of the Bolsheviks and their victims is unknown.
