= Hrushevsky Street (Kyiv) =

Street in Pecherskyi District, Ukraine

Mykhailo Hrushevskyi Street Вулиця Михайла Грушевського
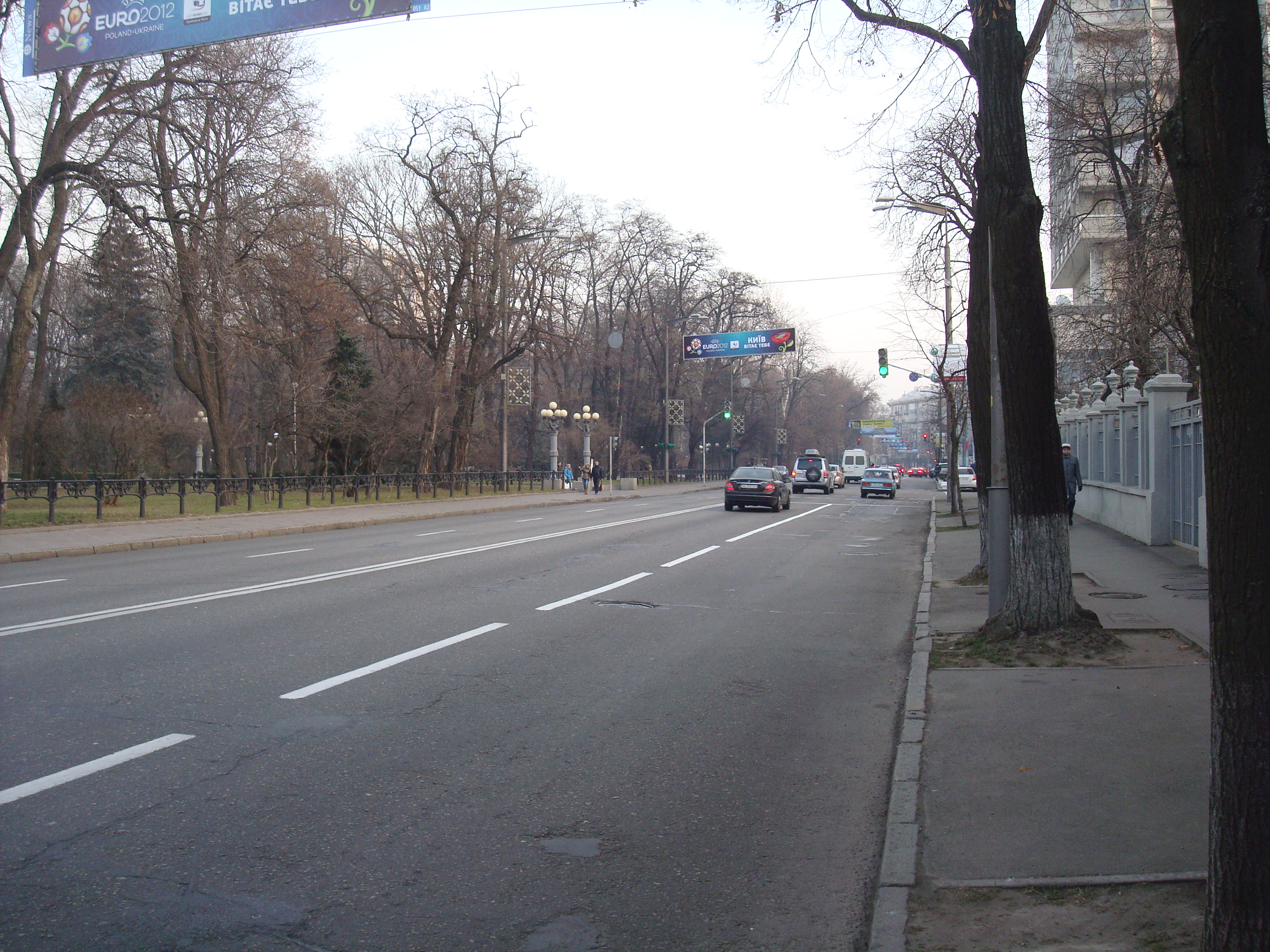
- Hrushevskyi street near Mariinskyi Park (2011)
- Former names: 1919–1934: Revolution st. 1934–1991: Serhii Kirov st. 1941–1943: I. Mazepa st.
- Length: 1,540 m (5,050 ft)
- Location: Pecherskyi District, Kyiv, Ukraine
- Coordinates: 50°27′6.5″N 30°31′41″E
- south end: Arsenal Square
- north end: European Square

Mykhailo Hrushevskyi Street or simply Hrushevskyi Street (Ukrainian: вулиця Михайла Грушевського, romanized: vulytsia Mykhaila Hrushevskoho) is a street in central Kyiv, the capital of Ukraine.

The street is named after Ukrainian academician, politician, historian, and statesman Mykhailo Hrushevsky. Hrushevsky wrote his first academic book on the history of Bar, Ukraine, titled Bar Starostvo: Historical Notes: XV-XVIII.

Mykhailo Hrushevskyi Street is located in the government quarter Lypky neighborhood of the Pecherskyi District. It houses the Supreme Council Building, Government Building and the Parliamentary Library. It is adjacent to Mariinskyi Park which contains Constitution Square.

The street acts as a border between the Pechersk and Lypky neighborhoods. At the European Square this street connects to Old Kyiv. There is a noticeable ascent that starts at the European Square and continues on all the way to the intersection with Garden Street next to the Government Building.

== History ==
The street was established sometime in the 1810s as part of the greater Alexander Street which included such modern streets as Sahaidachny Street, Volodymyr Descent, Museum Lane. The street was established along an old Ruthenian path called "Ivanivsky Road". After the return of the Soviets to Kyiv in 1919, the whole of Alexander Street was renamed Revolution Street. After the transfer of the capital from Kharkiv to Kyiv in 1934, the street was split and today's Hrushevskyi portion was renamed as Kirov Street.

It was one of the main sites of the Euromaidan protests in 2014.

== Connecting streets ==
- Peter's Alley
- Museum Lane
- Serf's Lane (Kriposny provulok)
- Garden Street
- Silken Street
- Linden Street
- Constitution Square (pedestrian plaza)

== Attractions ==
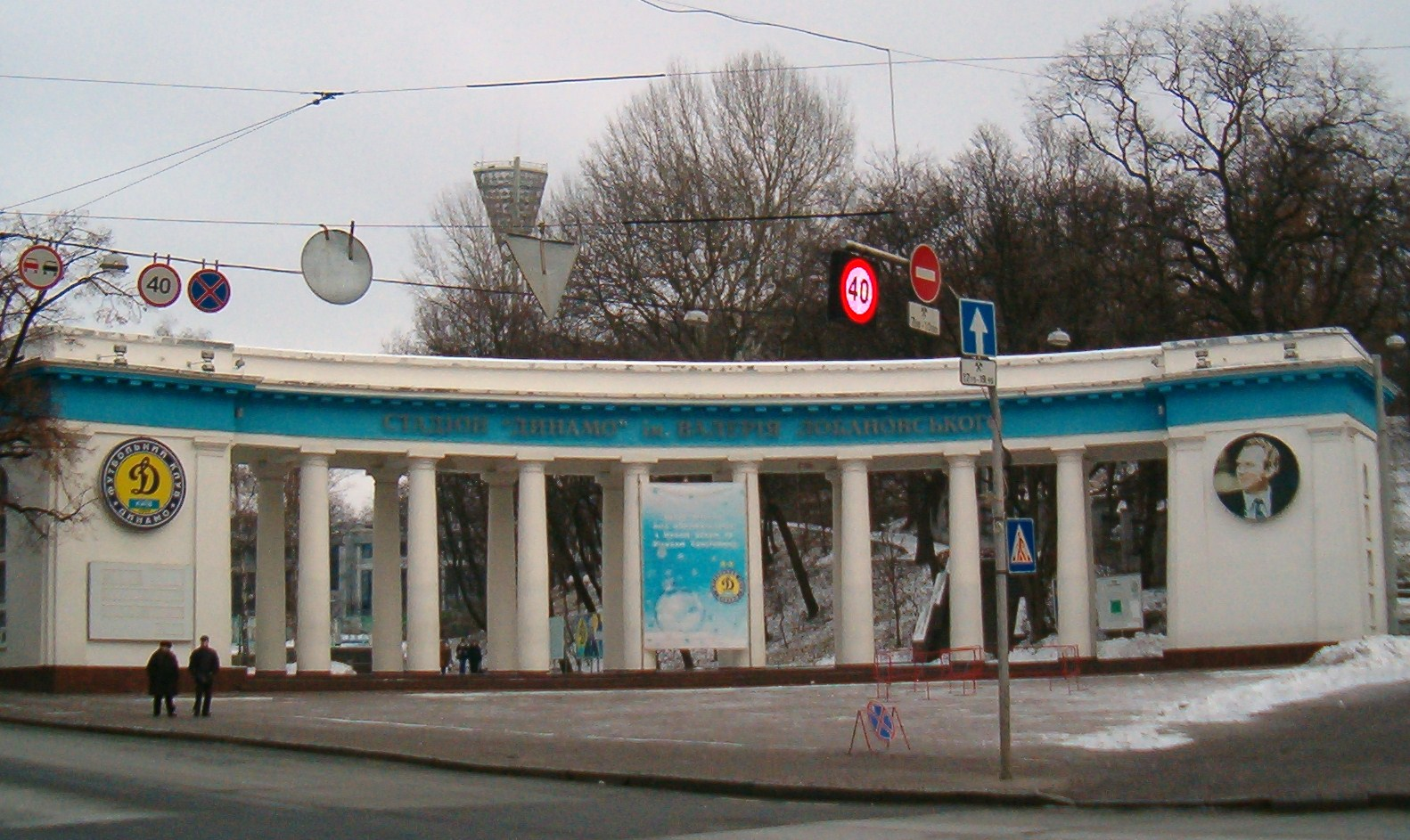
Stadium colonnade entrance at corner of Hrushevskyi Street and Peter's Alley

- Khreshchaty Park
- City Park
- Mariinskyi Park
- Kyiv Academic Puppet Theatre
- Valeriy Lobanovskyi Dynamo Stadium

=== Monuments ===
- Monument to Valeriy Lobanovsky
- Monument to Grigory Petrovsky (demolished in 2009)
- Nikolai Vatutin monument (demolished in 2023)

=== Research institutions and museums ===
- Water information center
- National Art Museum of Ukraine
- Ostap Vyshnia Library
- National Parliamentary Library of Ukraine
- National Academy of Sciences of Ukraine building
  - Institute of History of Ukraine
  - Taras Shevchenko Institute of Literature
  - Oleksandr Potebnia Institute of Language Studies
  - All-Ukrainian Society of Regional Researchers
  - Ukrainian Association of historians of science

=== Government institutions ===
- Library of Supreme Council of Ukraine
- Central House of Officers (Armed Forces of Ukraine, formerly House of Red Army)
  - Central Museum of Armed Forces of Ukraine (formerly Historical Museum of Kyiv District Troops)
  - Library of the Cultural, educational and welfare center of Armed Forces of Ukraine
  - Society of Officers of Ukraine
- Budynok Uryadu
  - Cabinet of Ukraine
  - Ministry of Finance
  - Ministry of Economic Development and Trade
- Embassy of China, Kyiv
- Verkhovna Rada building
- Hotel Kyiv

== See also ==
- Euromaidan
