= Nikolai Vatutin =

Soviet military commander (1901–1944)

- Николай Фёдорович Ватутин
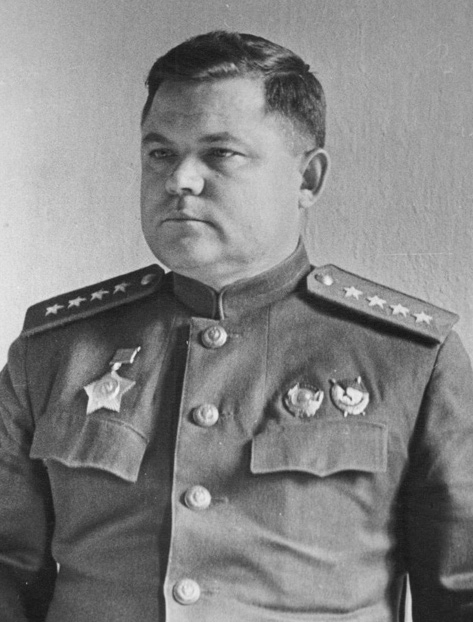
- Vatutin ib c. the 1940s
- Born: 16 December 1901; Chepukhino, Voronezh Governorate, Russian Empire
- Died: 15 April 1944 (aged 42); Kiev, Ukrainian SSR, Soviet Union
- Children: Elena (1930–?); Viktor (1932–?)
- Relatives: Tatiana Romanovna Vatutina (wife); Jelena (daughter, 1930–2018); Viktor (son, 1932–?)
- Military career
- Allegiance: Soviet Union
- Service years: 1920–1944
- Rank: Army General
- Nicknames: Grandmaster; General Offensive
- Commands: Voronezh Front; Southwestern Front; 1st Ukrainian Front
- Conflicts: Russian Civil War; Second World War; Great Patriotic War; Capture of Gorlovka; Battle of Stalingrad; Battle of Kursk; Dnieper–Carpathian Offensive; Zhitomir–Berdichev offensive; Battle of Korsun–Cherkassy; Rovno–Lutsk offensive; Ukrainian insurgency (DOW)
- Awards: Hero of the Soviet Union; Order of Lenin (2); Order of the Red Banner; Order of Suvorov, 1st class; Order of Kutuzov, 1st class

Signature
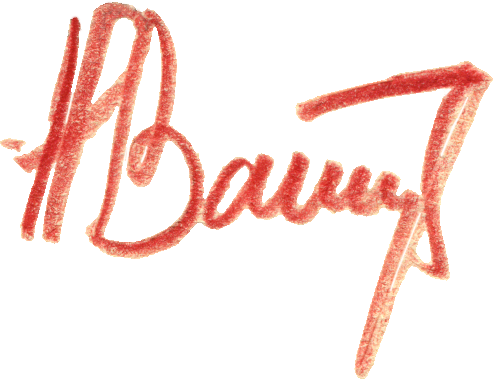

Nikolai Fyodorovich Vatutin (Russian: Николай Фёдорович Ватутин; 16 December 1901 – 15 April 1944) was a Soviet military commander during World War II who was responsible for many Red Army operations in the Ukrainian SSR as the commander of the Southwestern Front, and of the Voronezh Front during the Battle of Kursk. During the Soviet offensive to retake right-bank Ukraine, Vatutin led the 1st Ukrainian Front, which was responsible for the Red Army's offensives to the west and the southwest of Kiev and the eventual liberation of the city. He was ambushed in February 1944 by the Ukrainian Insurgent Army and died of his injuries in April.

== Early life ==
Vatutin was born in Chepukhino village in the Valuysky Uyezd, Voronezh Governorate (named Vatutino, Belgorod Oblast after him in 1968), into a peasant family of Russian ethnicity.

== Pre-war military service ==
Commissioned in 1920 to the Red Army, he fought against the peasant partisans of the anarchist Nestor Makhno. The following year, he became a member of the Russian Communist Party (Bolsheviks) and served diligently in junior command positions. From 1926, he spent the next decade alternating service with studies in the elite Frunze Military Academy and the General Staff Academy. The 1937–1938 purge of Red Army commanders opened the road to his promotion. In 1938, he received the rank of Komdiv, and he was appointed Chief of Staff of the important Kiev Special Military District. Throughout that period, Vatutin combined military service with intensive party activities.

In 1939, Vatutin planned operations for the Soviet invasion of Poland in conjunction with the German invasion. He served as Chief of Staff of the Red Army Southern Group. In 1940, under the command of Georgy Zhukov, that group seized Bessarabia from Romania. As a reward for the non-combat campaigns, Joseph Stalin promoted him to the rank of lieutenant general and appointed him to the critical post of Chief of the Operational Directorate of the General Staff. Vatutin was, however, not up to his new appointment. While innovative and hard-working, he lacked any combat experience, and his knowledge of operational art and strategy was too abstract. Still, his peasant roots, relative youthful age and party zeal made him one of Stalin's few favorites in the Soviet military. Vatutin, together with the rest of the Red Army high command, failed to prepare the army for the German attack of 22 June 1941.

On 30 June 1941, he was appointed Chief of Staff of the North-Western Front, which enabled him to exercise his better qualities. In that role, Vatutin did not try to claim success for himself in battles, but he made a point of identifying and promoting talented subordinates. He was notable for his audacity. Most of the Soviet generals, shattered by defeats, were then reluctant to carry out offensive operations, but Vatutin thrived on attack.

== The battles in the Northwest ==
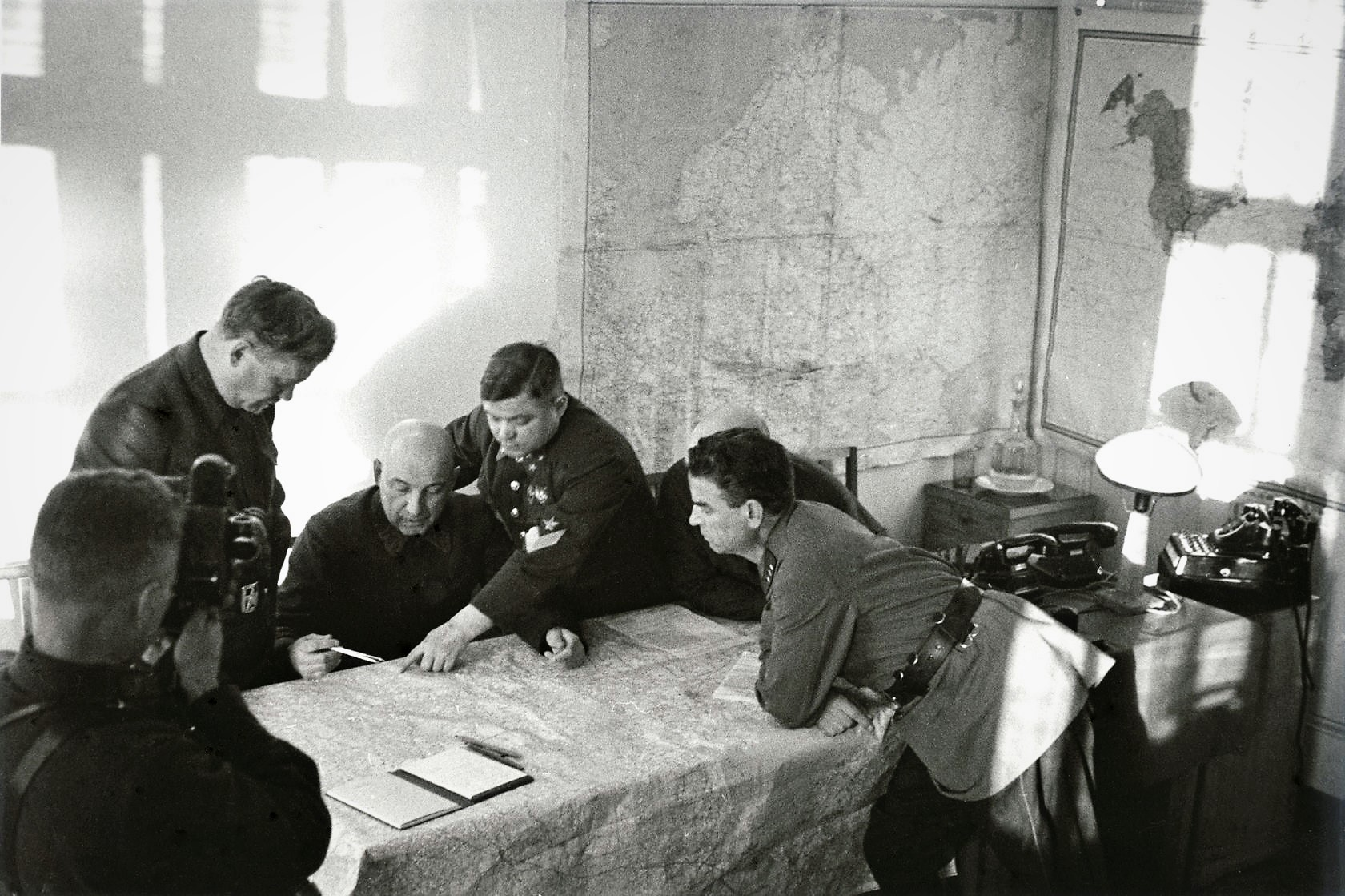
Vatutin (2nd from right) with officers of the Northwestern Front, February 1942

The Northwestern Front was defending Leningrad from the approaches by the German Army Group North, spearheaded by the armored corps led by Erich von Manstein. Vatutin took command of the Soviet forces near Novgorod, rallied them for offense, and attempted to encircle a large German force. He surprised Manstein, put him on the defensive, and forced the entire German Army Group North to regroup its troops to halt the Soviet offensive. The Wehrmacht lost the precious summer season needed for an effective attack on Leningrad, and the Red Army got additional time to strengthen the fortifications of the city. The Germans thus failed in their best shot to capture Leningrad, one of the key German strategic failures during the early phase of war. Vatutin's immediate operational results were far less impressive. He overestimated the capacities of his troops and created overly ambitious objectives, and his coordination of his forces and control over the unfolding of the battle were poor. Additionally, he did not take into account the difficult terrain, which benefited the German defenses and slowed his attack. Vatutin's casualty figures were staggering and in one army reached nearly 60%. The ineptitude of his subordinate commanders exacerbated Vatutin's own shortcomings. One striking exception to that pattern of deficiency was the brilliance of Ivan Chernyakhovsky, an obscure young colonel in command of the 28th Tank Division. Both men had much in common, most prominently their penchant for unorthodox approaches to military art, and soon became close friends.

In January 1942, during the Soviet winter offensive after the Red Army victory at the Battle of Moscow, Vatutin's forces trapped two German corps in Demyansk and achieved the first large Soviet encirclement of German forces. The German and the Soviet Armies were equal in size. During the battle, Vatutin employed innovative tactics and actions, but the Germans responded more conventionally. The Red Army was unable to destroy the German defenses, mainly because of the weakness of the Soviet Air Force.

In April 1942, Vatutin finally breached the German lines just as a German relief force arrived. However, post-war American experts have evaluated the result of that operation as a draw. The German command drew self-congratulatory and misleading lessons from their narrow escape by concluding that they could overcome Soviet encirclements with supplies from the air while mounting a relief operation. That thinking contributed to the Wehrmacht's disaster at the Battle of Stalingrad since the Soviet Air Force proved much more capable of disrupting the Luftwaffe's resupply efforts.

== Voronezh and Stalingrad ==
From early May to July 1942, Vatutin served briefly as deputy of the Chief of the General Staff of the Red Army until the German Army Group South embarked on its huge strategic offense, Operation Blau. Initially, the Germans' assault focused on Voronezh. They wanted to breach the Soviet front line at the Battle of Voronezh and then to attack the Soviet Southern Front and the Southwestern Front from the rear. On 1 July 1942, Stalin sent Vatutin as an all-powerful Stavka representative to the critical Bryansk Front; within a few days, it was renamed as Voronezh Front and placed under Vatutin's command.

During the battle, Vatutin again met Chernyakhovsky, who had just been appointed commander of the 18th Tank Corps of the 60th Army. The German attack was on the verge of breaching the Soviet front line when Cherniakhovsky's corps arrived by train. He unloaded one of his brigades and, without waiting for the rest of his troops, led that brigade against the German forces, and threw them back. After that action, Vatutin asked Stalin to give command of the 60th army to Cherniakhovsky. Initially, Stalin opposed the request, mostly because he had reservations about appointing such a young general to lead a field army. However, Vatutin finally convinced Stalin to promote Cherniakhovsky, who would rapidly rise to become one of the major Red Army field commanders.

Although the Germans captured the city, their attempt to breach Vatutin's front line failed. The Germans abandoned their initial plan and shifted their efforts toward Stalingrad. On 22 October 1942, Vatutin received command of the newly-formed Southwestern Front and played an important role in planning the Soviet counter-offensive and the encirclement of the German 6th Army in the Battle of Stalingrad. In December 1942, to secure the Soviet ring around Stalingrad, Vatutin's forces encircled and destroyed two thirds of the 130,000-strong Italian 8th Army in operation Little Saturn. That contributed to the defeat of Manstein's Operation Wintergewitter ("Winter Storm"), the relief effort for the 6th Army.

== Kharkov and Kursk ==
In January 1943, Vatutin's Southwest Front drove the Germans from Eastern Ukraine. His actions enabled the Voronezh Front under General Filipp Golikov to capture Kharkov, but he had overextended his depleted troops and not paid sufficient attention to the changing strategic situation. In February 1943, Manstein, using the forces extricated from the Caucasus, took advantage of Vatutin's lapse in situational awareness and managed to surprise and to defeat Vatutin south of Kharkov, which led to the encirclement of Golikov's advance troops in Kharkov and the recapture of the city at the Third Battle of Kharkov. The Stavka removed Golikov from his command but did not see Vatutin's debacle as significant. Vatutin's audacity made Stalin award him the rank of Army General.

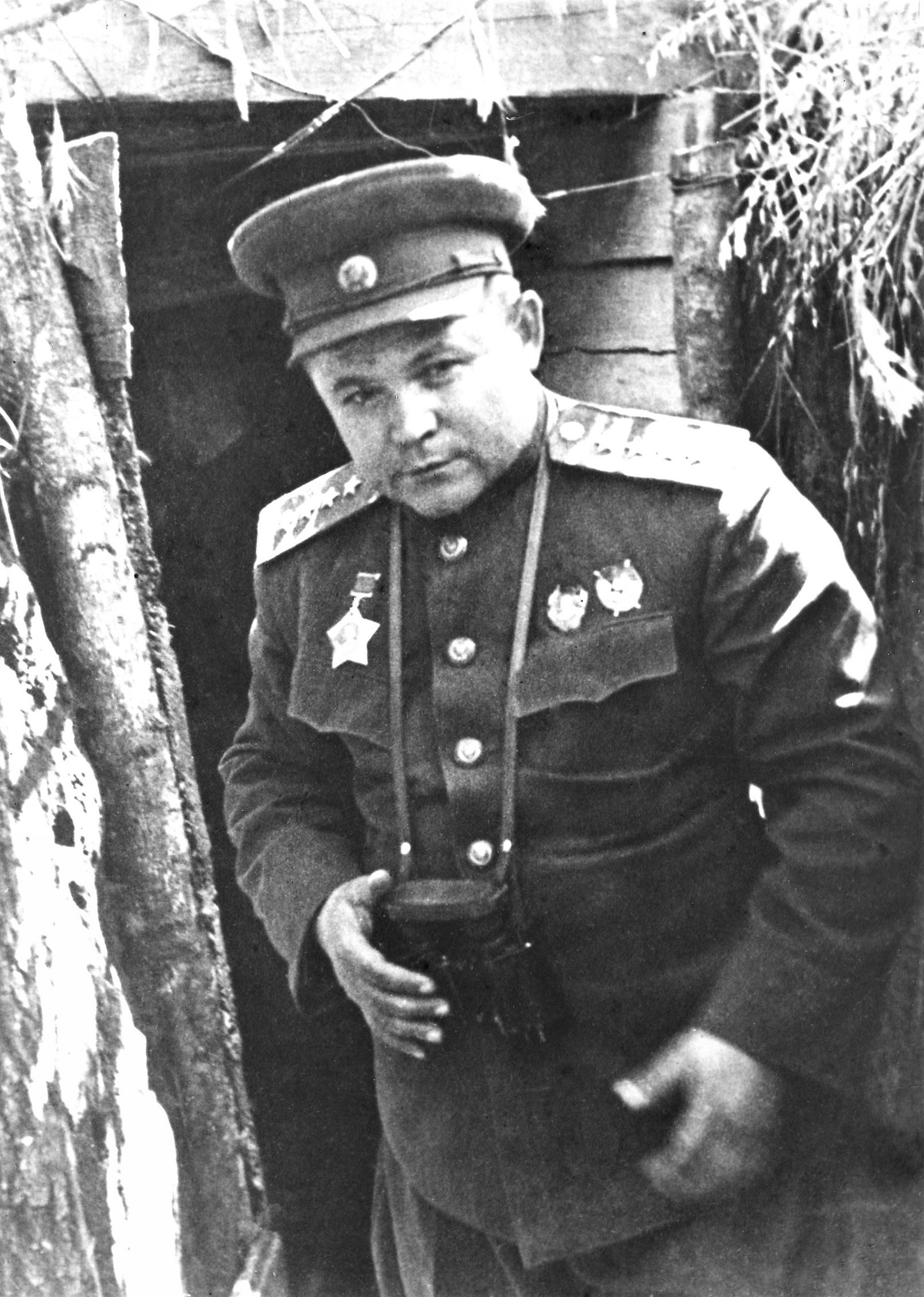
Vatutin in 1943

On 28 March 1943, Vatutin took command of the Voronezh Front, which was preparing for the momentous Battle of Kursk. At Kursk, he rejected conventional echeloning of armies, and his innovative deployment allowed him to not only conduct a skillful defence against the technically superior Germans, but also gave him the opportunity to quickly switch from defense to offense. Following the Soviet victory at Kursk, Belgorod was liberated.

== Kiev and Korsun-Cherkassy Pocket ==
After the Soviet victory at Kursk, Vatutin now aspired to retake Kiev. He regrouped his forces and surprised Manstein by sweeping tank forces through swampland and scattering the Germans from the unexpected direction. On 6 November 1943, Kiev was liberated. Vatutin relentlessly exploited his victory in Kiev, pushed deep into the German defenses, and destroyed the German defensive line. However, Vatutin overextended his armies, and Manstein used his reserve forces in the XLVIII Panzerkorps to counterattack. At the Battle of Radomyshl (6–15 November 1943) and the Battle of the Meleni Pocket (16–23 December 1943), Manstein unleashed successful counter-attacks, which took terrain back and inflicted heavy losses on the Red Army's forces.

Regaining the initiative in winter weather, Vatutin's front and the 2nd Ukrainian Front of Army General Ivan Konev carried out in January the sudden encirclement of the Korsun salient at the Dnieper River during the Korsun–Shevchenkovsky Offensive. Although Vatutin started the operation two days after Konev and his striking formation, and the 6th Tank Army had been only recently formed, Vatutin achieved the element of surprise by committing his tanks to the battle from the first echelon and once again attacking from unexpected terrain. That allowed the 6th Tank Army to penetrate deep into German defenses, and on 3 February, it linked with the advancing armor of Konev's front and trapped 56,000 German troops. By 17 February, Vatutin and Konev's forces had eliminated the Korsun-Cherkassy Pocket, but many of the encircled troops had managed to escape.

== Death ==
On 28 February 1944, Vatutin, regrouping for a new operation and heading to Slavuta (Khmelnytskyi Oblast), was ambushed by Ukrainian Insurgent Army (UPA) insurgents far behind the front lines near the village of Myliatyn in Ostroh Raion (Rivne Oblast). He died of sepsis, caused by the injuries, in a hospital at Kiev six weeks later. Vatutin's brothers, Afanasy Fyodorovich and Semyon Fyodorovich, were killed in action in February and March 1944. Their mother, Vera Yefimovna, buried her three sons in two months.

Erickson says that Vatutin left Rovno for Slavuta in a convoy of a dozen men in three light cars; branching off the Rovno highway they were attacked by a hundred guerrillas. Vatutin ordered his staff officer to withdraw but refused to leave. At sunset they were disengaging but Vatutin was seriously wounded, and one truck refused to start. Major-General Krainyukov and a staff officer carried Vatutin along the road. They found a peasant with two horses, and put Vatutin, heavily soaked in blood, in a sledge. They drove for the Rovno highway, and in a wayside hut a regimental doctor applied emergency dressings to his mangled right leg. He was transferred to Kiev but never recovered, dying on 15 April aged 42 years. From 1 March Marshal Zhukov assumed full command of the 1st Ukrainian Front. Vatutin was given a state funeral in Kiev.

After the war, the Chekists documented two more versions of the attack on Vatutin. During one of the Chekist operations, on January 15, 1946, Fedir Vorobets (Vereshchak), the former commander of the "Tiutiunnyk" UPA group, was captured. During one of the interrogations, he said that the attack on Nikolai Vatutin had taken place in the area of Sotnia of Derkach and had been done by units of the Sluzhba Bezpeky (OUN Security Service) in the villages of Mikhalkivtsi and Siancy of Ostrovsky district of Rivne region. According to various sources, 17 to 27 fighters took part in the operation.

Another version of Vatutin's death was told in the 1990s by the UPA veteran Yevhen Basyuk ("Chernomorets"). According to him, a detachment of 30 people under the command of Primak ("Troian") took part in the clash with the general's bodyguard. When the column appeared, the UPA soldiers unloaded the carts of the convoy, which had been seized from the Red Army, and the carts opened fire spontaneously without any ambush.

Vatutin was buried in Kiev's Mariinskyi Park near the Ukrainian Parliament. A monument dedicated to him was erected at his burial site in 1948. This monument was designed by a prominent Soviet sculptor Yevgeny Vuchetich. The Kyiv City State Administration dismantled the Vatutin monument on 9 February 2023. In June 2017, the Kyiv City Council had already renamed the city's General Vatutin Avenue into Roman Shukhevych Avenue. During the war Shukhevych fought against Soviet forces, first being a company commander and the highest-ranking Ukrainian officer in the Nachtigall Battalion, then serving as an officer in the Schutzmannschaft Battalion 201, and later becoming one of the military leaders of UPA.

== Legacy ==
Vatutin's influence on the Red Army strategic planning, operational, and tactical techniques continued even after his death. After the Cold War, a decline in Germanocentric analyses of the Eastern Front has made Vatutin win recognition among Western military experts as one of World War II's most creative commanders:

At Kursk, Vatutin was able to stop Manstein's powerful armoured spearheads well short of their objectives and then shift to a counteroffensive that shattered the German front. Vatutin surprised Manstein at Belgorod in August and thoroughly outmanoeuvred him at Kiev in December. Vatutin demonstrated great flexibility during the Korsun offensive, taking advantage of fleeting opportunities rather than reinforcing failure, which resulted in his armour encircling two German corps. However, Vatutin was unable to prevent Manstein from relieving the Korsun Pocket, but this limited success squandered Manstein's last operational reserves. Vatutin would surely have played a major role in finishing off Manstein's command in the Kamenets-Podolsky offensive if Ukrainian partisans had not fatally wounded him after Korsun. Nevertheless, Vatutin had demonstrated that Manstein's style of Bewegungskrieg did not work against a steady opponent and that the Red Army had some commanders who could turn the tables and conduct a form of manoeuvre warfare that astonished even Manstein.

In November 2014, the Ukrainian Institute of National Memory included Vatutin on the list of 'persons involved in the struggle against Ukraine's independence, the organization of famines, and political repressions.'

On 9 February 2023, a monument to Vatutin atop his grave in Kyiv's Mariinskyi Park was dismantled and relocated to the local Aviation Museum. Also in February 2023, the village of Vatutine in northeastern Ukraine, previously named for Vatutin, was set to be renamed Zaluzhne, after Ukrainian general Valerii Zaluzhnyi. On 11 November 2023 the Cabinet of Ministers of Ukraine removed the status of monument from the grave of Vatutin that was still existing at the feet of the then already removed monument in order to comply with 2023 derussification laws.

In April 2023, the Poltava City Council voted to dismantle the monument to Vatutin in this city.

== Sources ==
- Erickson, John (1989) [1983]. The Road to Berlin, Stalin's War with Germany, Volume 2. Yale University Press. p. 182. ISBN 0-300-07813-7.
- Keegan, John (ed.) (1996) Atlas of the Second World War. ISBN 0 7230 0939 2
- Forczyk, Robert. (2010). Erich von Manstein : leadership, strategy conflict. Oxford: Osprey Pub. ISBN 978-1-84603-465-7. OCLC 436030170
