= Vatutino =

Vatutino Ватутино
- Selo
- Location within Belgorod Oblast Location within Russia
- Coordinates: 50°17′N 38°18′E
- Country: Russia
- Region: Belgorod Oblast
- District: Valuysky District
- Time zone: UTC+3:00

Vatutino (Russian: Ватýтино) is a rural locality (a selo) in Valuysky District, Belgorod Oblast, Russia. The population was 27 as of 2010. There is 1 street.

The locality is named after Nikolai Vatutin (1901–1944), a Russian military commander of the Great Patriotic War, who was born in the village. It had been known as Chepukhino (Russian: Чепухино) for centuries until 1968.

== Geography ==
Vatutino is located 23 km northeast of Valuyki (the district's administrative centre) by road. Voronovka is the nearest rural locality.
