= Nikolai Vatutin monument =

Monument in Kyiv, Ukraine

- Interactive map of Nikolai Vatutin monument
- Location: Kyiv, Ukraine
- Coordinates: 50°26′48″N 30°32′19″E
- Designer: Yevgeny Vuchetich
- Beginning date: 1948
- Opening date: 1948
- Dedicated to: Nikolai Vatutin
- Dismantled date: 9 February 2023

The Nikolai Vatutin monument was a sculpture monument to Soviet military commander Nikolai Vatutin, erected in 1948 and located in Mariinskyi Park, Kyiv, Ukraine, that was dismantled on 9 February 2023.

== History ==
Nikolai Vatutin was a Soviet military commander during World War II who directed a number of Red Army operations in the Ukrainian SSR, including the recapture of Kiev (Kyiv) by the Red Army in 1943.John Keegan (ed.) (1996) ‘‘Atlas of the Second World War’’. ISBN 0 7230 0939 2 pp. 126–127 On 28 February 1944, Vatutin was ambushed by Ukrainian Insurgent Army (UPA) insurgents behind the front lines near the village of Mylyatyn, in Ostroh Raion, Rivne Oblast. He died from sepsis caused by his wounds in a hospital in Kiev on 15 April 1944.Russian: Каманин, Н.П., “Летчики и космонавты”, М, 1971, p.269. Some sources give the date of the attack as 29 February and the date of Vatutin’s death as 15 April.

Vatutin was buried in Kyiv’s Mariinskyi Park, near the Ukrainian Parliament, in front of a statue depicting him. The monument was erected in 1948.(in Ukrainian) Vatutina’s grandson: if you carry the grave from Kyiv, then with military honors, Radio Free Europe (9 May 2020) It was designed by the Soviet sculptor Yevgeny Vuchetich.(in Ukrainian) Minkultura recommends that Kyiv dismantle the Vatutin monument near the Verkhovna Rada, Ukrainska Pravda (27 January 2023) The inscription on the pedestal read: “To General Vatutin from the Ukrainian people.”

In 2010, the Kyiv City State Administration granted the monument the status of a cultural heritage site.

In 2015, Vatutin’s daughter Elena(in Ukrainian) Vatutin’s monument in Kyiv: to be or not to be a monument to a Soviet general?, Radio Free Europe (9 May 2020) stated that her father had been buried in Kiev, now Kyiv, by Nikita Khrushchev against the wishes of the family. She also said that his surviving relatives lived in Russia and the Czech Republic, and that she would seek permission to rebury him in Moscow. The family linked the request mainly to its opposition to the Ukrainian government’s association with Stepan Bandera, whose Ukrainian Insurgent Army followers had killed Vatutin. An initial press release from A Just Russia — For Truth had claimed that the initiative to move the remains came from the Kyiv City State Administration.Генерал Ватутин Киеву не мешает. ‘‘Radio Svoboda’’. 12 April 2015.Dispute Rages Over Soviet General’s Grave In Ukraine. ‘‘Radio Free Europe/Radio Liberty’’. 11 April 2015. The reburial did not take place, and Vatutin’s grave and monument remained in Mariinskyi Park.(in Russian) Monument to General Vatutin continue to stand outside the building in Kyiv, Rada, RIA Novosti (30 June 2016)

In November 2014, the Ukrainian Institute of National Memory included Vatutin on a list of persons described as being involved in the struggle against Ukrainian independence, the organization of famines and political repressions. After the adoption of the Ukrainian decommunization laws in 2015, however, Vatutin was not initially included on the list of persons subject to decommunization.

Elena Vatutina died in 2016.

On 27 January 2023, the Ministry of Culture and Information Policy proposed that the Kyiv City State Administration dismantle the Vatutin monument and move it elsewhere. One option mentioned was storage at the National Museum-Preserve “Battle for Kyiv 1943”. On 8 February 2023, the ministry revoked the monument’s Ukrainian cultural heritage status.(in Ukrainian) Minkult allowed the dismantling of monuments to Chkalov and Vatutin in Kyiv: the first is already being demolished, Ukrainska Pravda (8 February 2023)

The Kyiv City State Administration announced on 8 February 2023 that the monument would be removed the following day. It was dismantled on 9 February.(in Ukrainian) Mariinsky Park without Vatutin. The monument to the Soviet general was finally demolished, Ukrainska Pravda – Zhyttia (9 February 2023) (Note: The Kyiv City State Administration announced on 9 February 2023 that it was waiting for approval for the demolition of the city’s monument to Alexander Pushkin and for the demolition of the Mykola Shchors monument.)

On 11 November 2023, the Cabinet of Ministers of Ukraine removed the protected monument status from Vatutin’s grave, which remained at the foot of the site where the monument had stood. The decision was taken in order to comply with 2023 derussification laws."The government has adopted a decision that removes the protection status from a number of monuments of the Soviet and imperial era" (in Ukrainian). Istorychna Pravda. 11 November 2023.

== Gallery ==
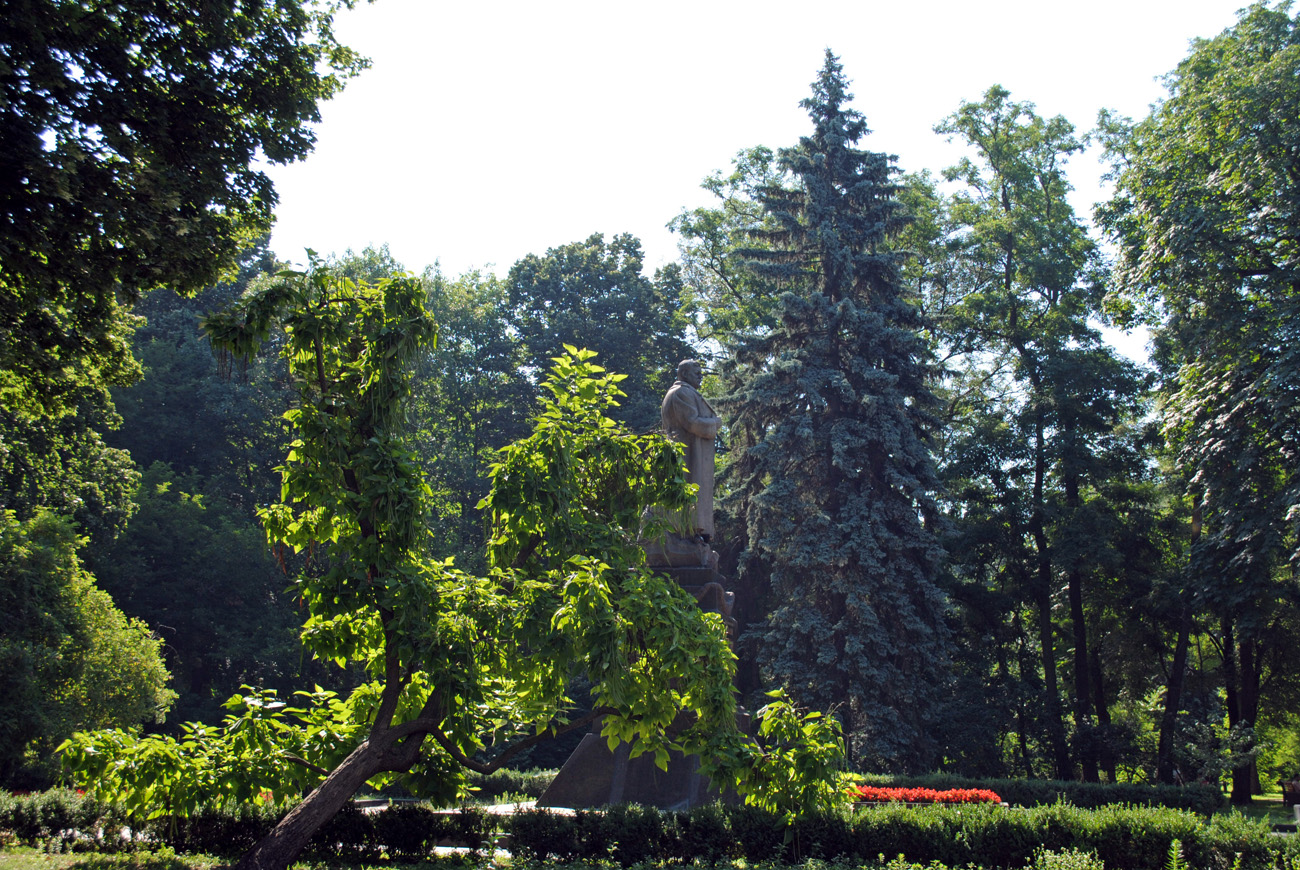
The same place in July 2013

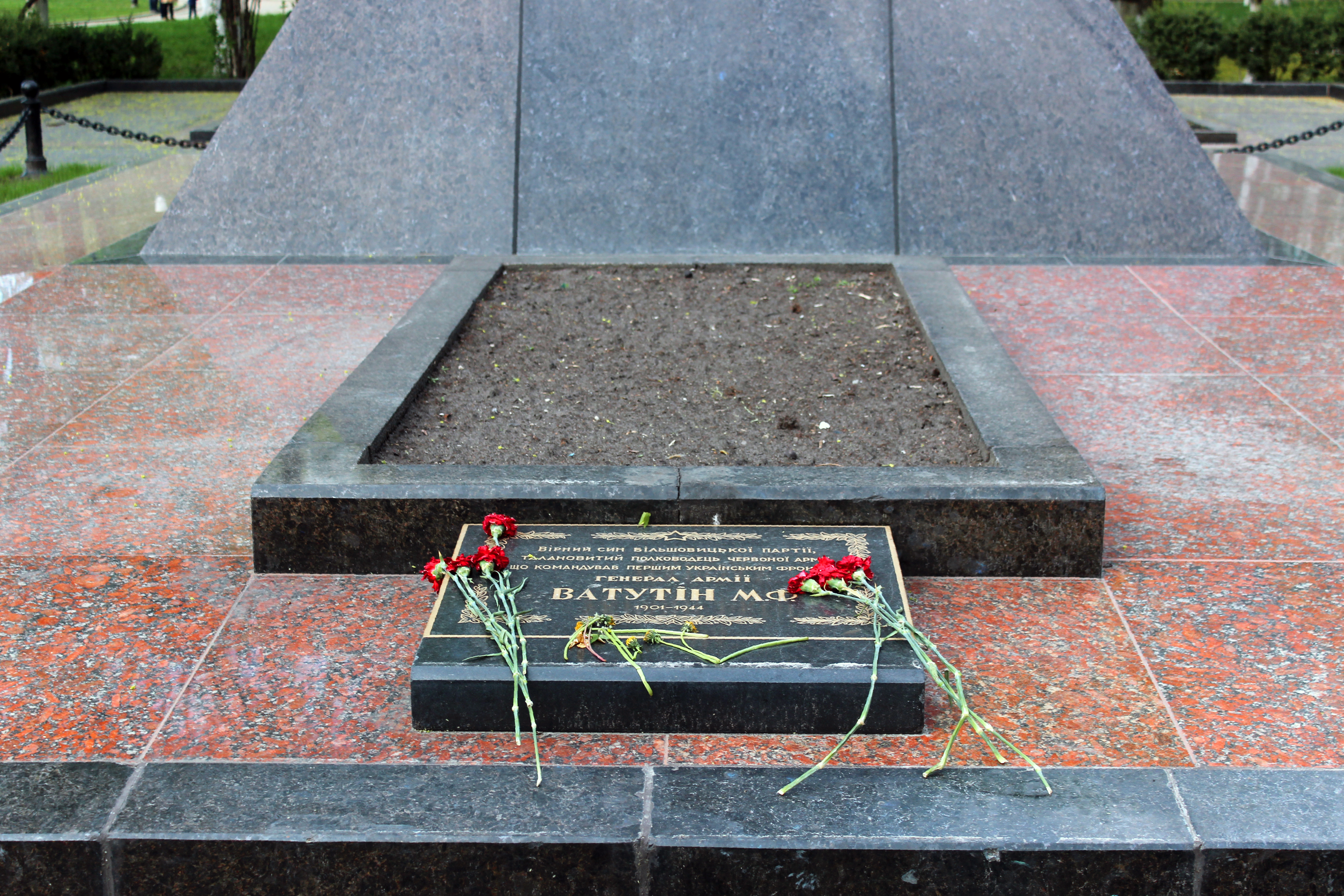
The grave of Nikolai Vatutin laying at the feet of the monument in April 2016

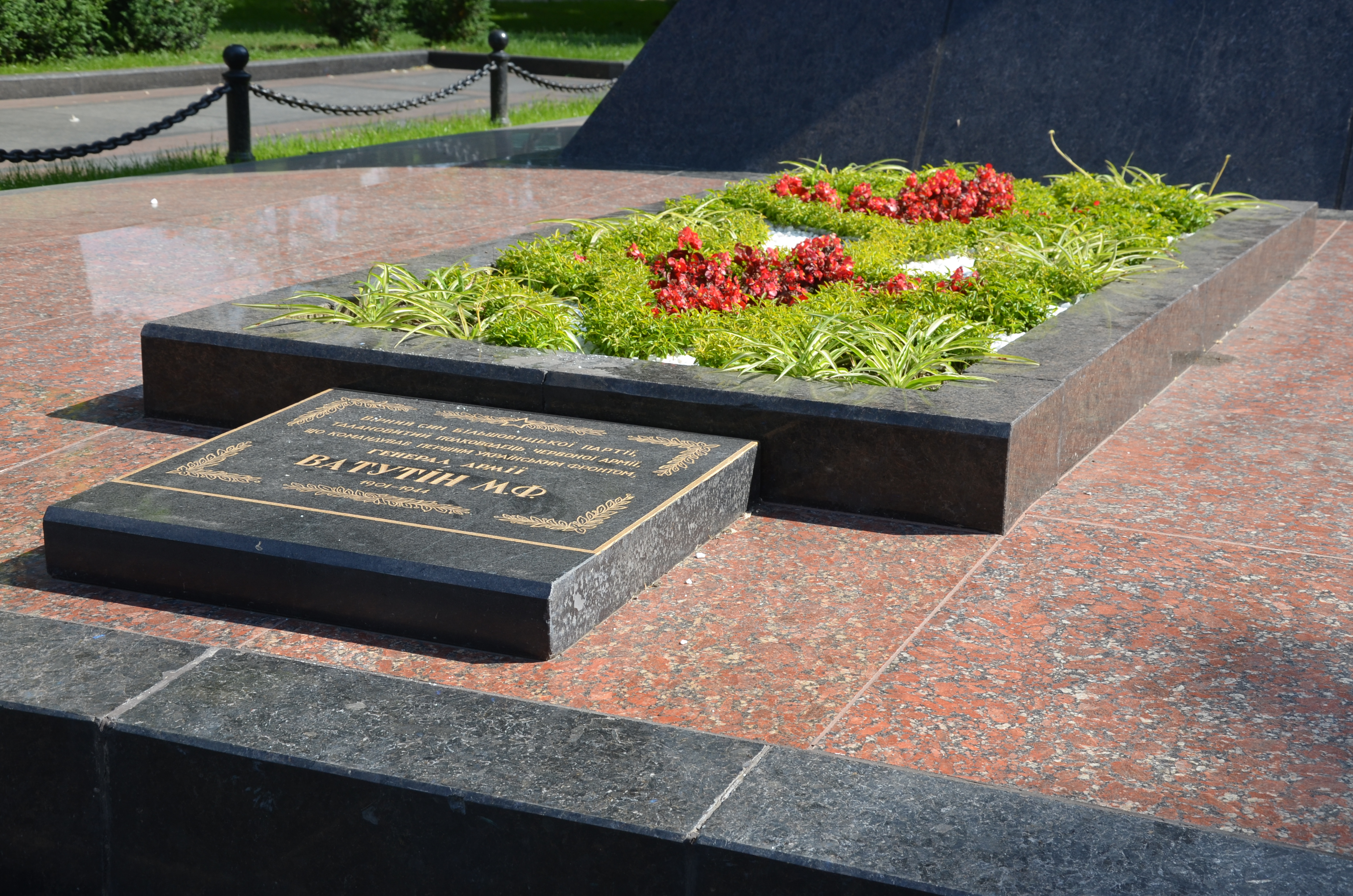
The same place in June 2016

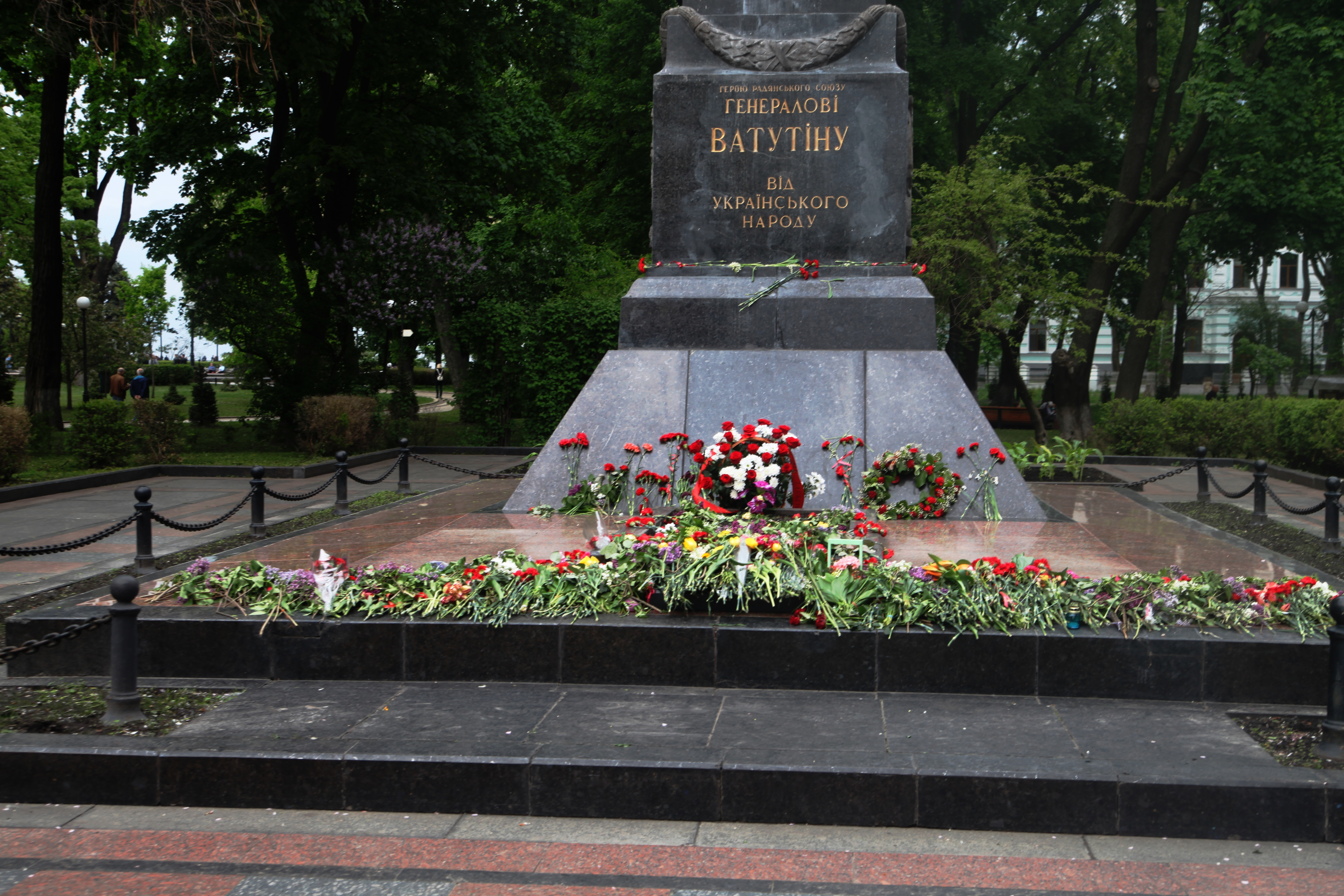
The grave of Nikolai Vatutin on 10 May 2019

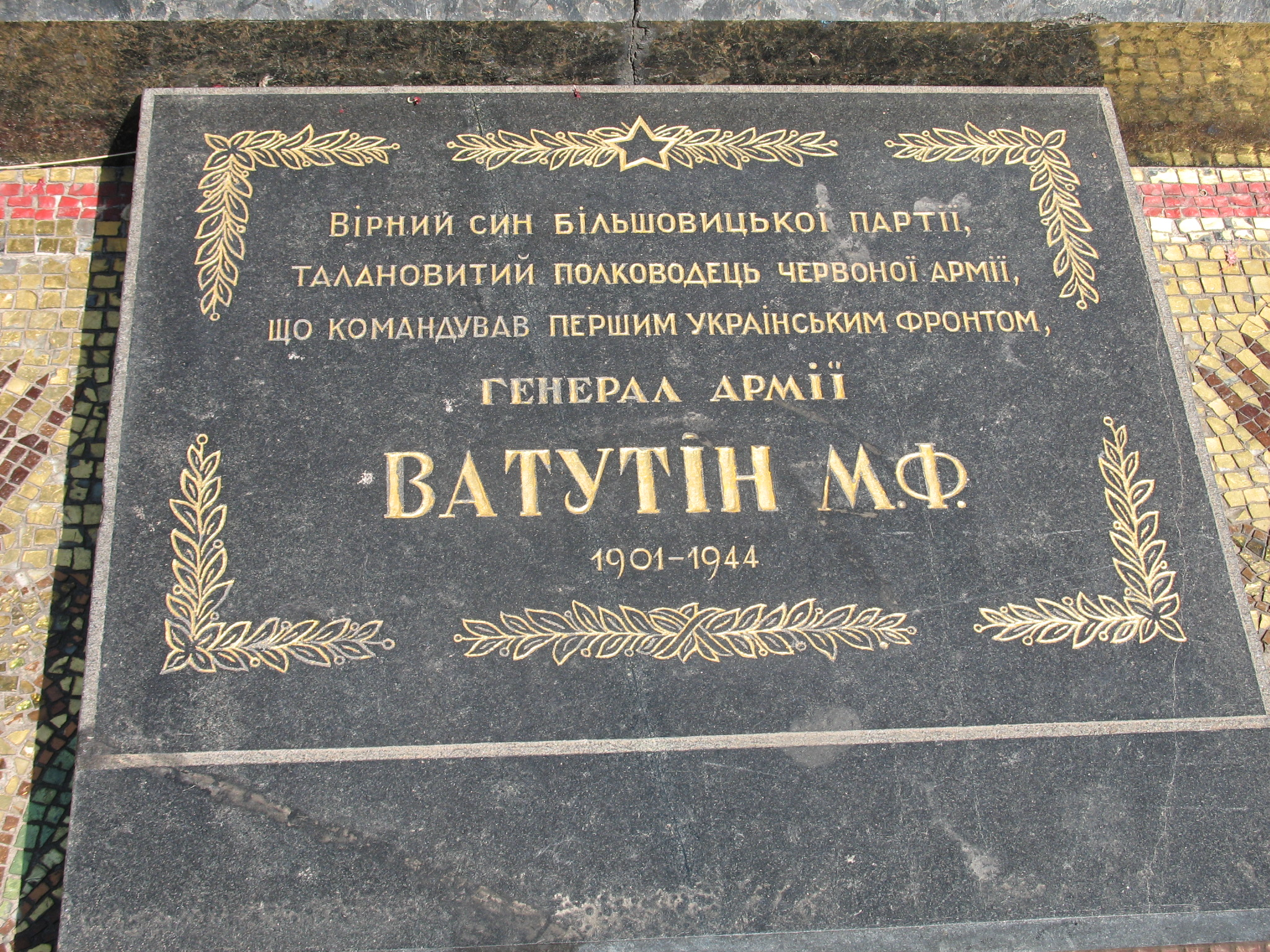
Vatutin's tombstone in August 2007

== See also ==
- Demolition of monuments to Vladimir Lenin in Ukraine
- Demolition of monuments to Alexander Pushkin in Ukraine
