= Verkhovna Rada building =

Ukrainian Parliament building

Ukrainian Parliament Building Будинок Верховної Ради
- Interactive map of the Ukrainian Parliament Building; Будинок Верховної Ради area

General information
- Architectural style: Socialist Classicism
- Location: Lypky district, 5, Hrushevsky Street, Kyiv, Ukraine
- Coordinates: 50°26′50″N 30°32′13″E
- Current tenants: Parliament of Ukraine
- Construction started: 1936
- Completed: 1939; 87 years ago
- Renovated: 1945–47
- Destroyed: World War II
- Owner: State Bureau of Affairs

Height
- Height: 40 m (130 ft)

Dimensions
- Diameter: 16 m (52 ft)

Technical details
- Floor count: 3

Design and construction
- Architect: Volodymyr Zabolotnyi
- Awards: Architecture landmark

Website
- Google 3D Tour

The Verkhovna Rada building (Ukrainian: Будинок Верховної Ради, romanized: Budynok Verchovnoï Rady) is located in the center of Kyiv, in the Pecherskyi District. The building is located at the Constitution Square.

It is the place where the Ukrainian parliament (Verkhovna Rada) meets for all regular and ceremonial sessions. The building was erected between 1936–38 during the reign of Joseph Stalin to a design by Volodymyr Zabolotnyi in the Socialist Classicalist architectural style. Zabolotny was awarded the State Prize for that project in 1940 and was appointed the chief architect of the city.

The building is located on the eastern side of Hrushevsky Street, across from the Cabinet of Ministers of Ukraine building, and is surrounded by the Mariinskyi Palace, Mariinskyi Park, and a pedestrian park square. From the square, the building, and the palace are seen next to each other, along with views from the Kyiv heights to the left-bank neighborhoods across the Dnieper River.

== History ==
At the beginning of 1934, after the capital of the Ukrainian SSR was transferred from Kharkiv to Kyiv, many new projects were started for the reconstruction of the new capital. Many prominent administrative buildings to house the government institutions of the Ukrainian SSR were planned to be erected in downtown Kyiv, including the building of the government and the building of the Ministry of Foreign Affairs. The very heart of the city was chosen for that purpose — the Pecherskyi District which lies on the right bank of Dnieper river.

In February 1936, a contest for the best building design of the Verkhovna Rada was announced. Numerous prominent specialists were invited, including Volodymyr Zabolotnyi, Valerian Rykov, and Yakiv Steinberg. The jury selected the design of Zabolotnyi. The construction was initiated in 1936 and lasted until 1939 with the final inspection taking place at the beginning of the summer, having the building passed with an excellent grade. The first session of the Verkhovna Rada took place at 5, Hrushevsky Street on 25 July 1939.

=== Main features ===
The building is designed in a strict rectangular-symmetrical form and is three floors high. It is crowned with a dome, made of metal and glass, providing the building with natural lighting. The hundred-tonne glass dome over the main session hall is the building's most memorable feature. The red-and-blue Flag of Ukrainian SSR was flown on top of the dome for over 50 years, until it was replaced by the yellow-and-blue national Flag of Ukraine, following Ukraine's attainment of independence in 1991.

The dome's multicolored illumination at night provides a memorable view, one of Kyiv's tourist attractions. The diameter of the plafond is 16 meters. In the center a crystal chandelier is located that, by its form, resembles a sunflower, a motif frequently featured in the Ukrainian folk arts. Based on this design, the illuminating plafond of the hall was installed with colored glass. The interior of the building is generously decorated with intricate wood panels, multicolored marble, bronze artwork, and statuary. The flat rooftop of the modern structure adds harmony to its composition. The front of the building was decorated with ornaments and statues featuring Ukrainian SSR symbolism, with the Coat of Arms of the Ukrainian SSR in the center.

=== Post WWII reconstruction and 21st century decommunization ===
Having been destroyed in the Second World War, the building was reconstructed in its original style in 1945–1947, with the reconstruction design provided by Zabolotnyi, once again. The glass dome was rebuilt one meter higher than the original one. Although it is adjacent to Rastrelli's Baroque Mariinskyi Palace (1752), the architect of the more monumental and imposing Rada building managed to avoid disharmony from the juxtaposition of such contrasting architectural styles. To the main building was added an adjacent three-story high building for servicemen that is designed in a closed half-circle shape with an inner court.

During the restoration works conducted in 1985 under the leadership of Nataliia Chmutina (Note: Chmutina was one of several assistants of Zabolotny when his building design won the contest in 1936.), four sculptural groups (sculptor Valentyn Znoba) were installed in front of the risalits of the central entrance as intended by Zabolotny's design. The sculptures represent various segments of the Ukrainian population: workers, peasants, scientists, and intelligentsia.

The building's exterior is addressed in light colors through the use of light plaster and light-gray granite. These tones contrast with the dark shade of a socle, made out of polished labradorite, and has a significant jut against a plane wall. All rooms of the three-story building were designed in a single compact scope. The facades are symmetrical and have one order that received more extensive interpretation for the colonnade of the main facade (quarter columns), as well as the main planes of side facades (three-quarter columns).

Following 1991's Ukrainian independence, some decorations were altered and some replaced, to reflect the national symbolism of independent Ukraine. Currently, the stylized trident, the centerpiece of the modern coat of arms of Ukraine, is featured above the front entrance to the building. In 2016, the last decorations believed to show communist imagery were removed to comply with 2015 decommunization laws.

== Gallery ==
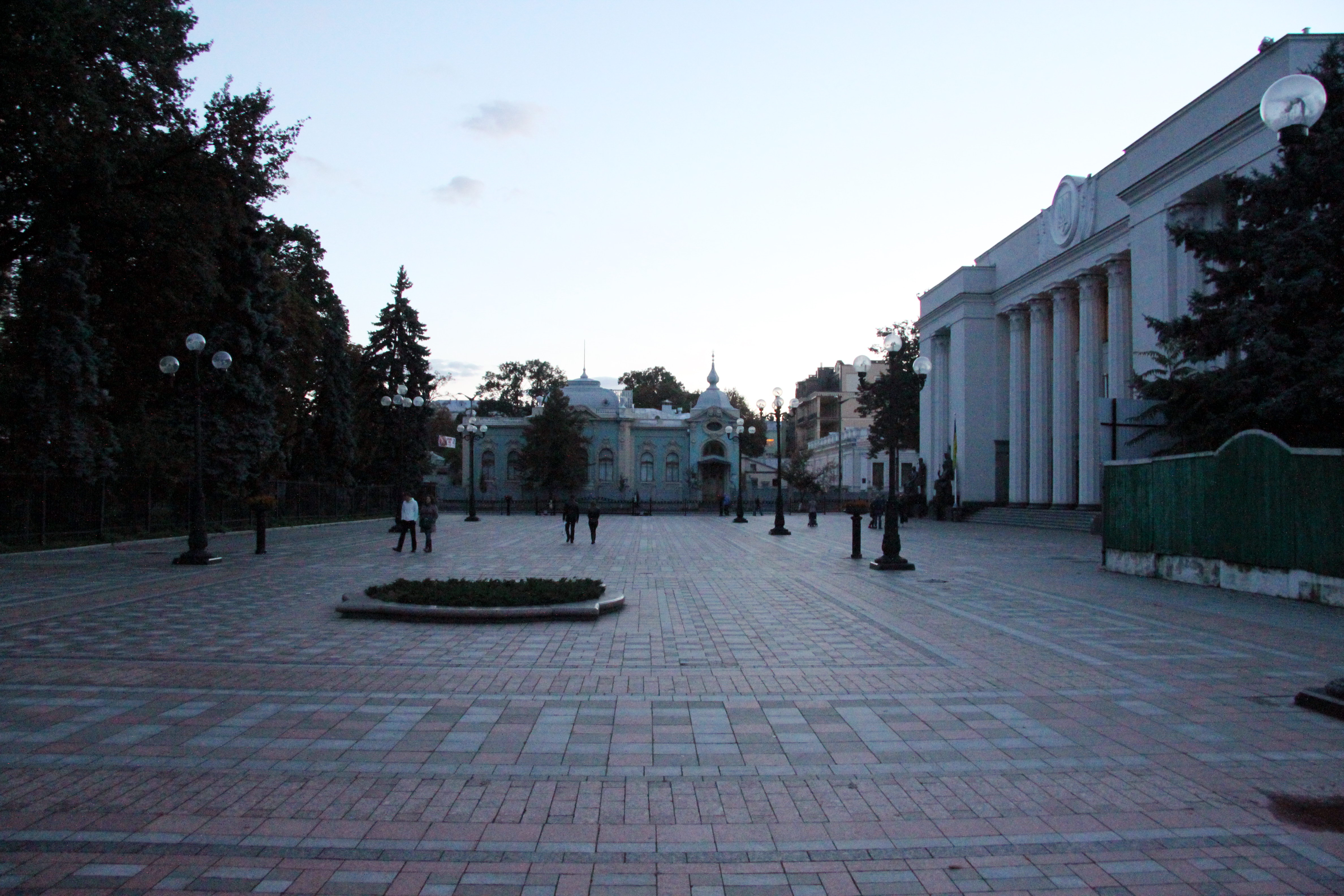
Verkhovna Rada (right) Polyakova House (center) in 2013

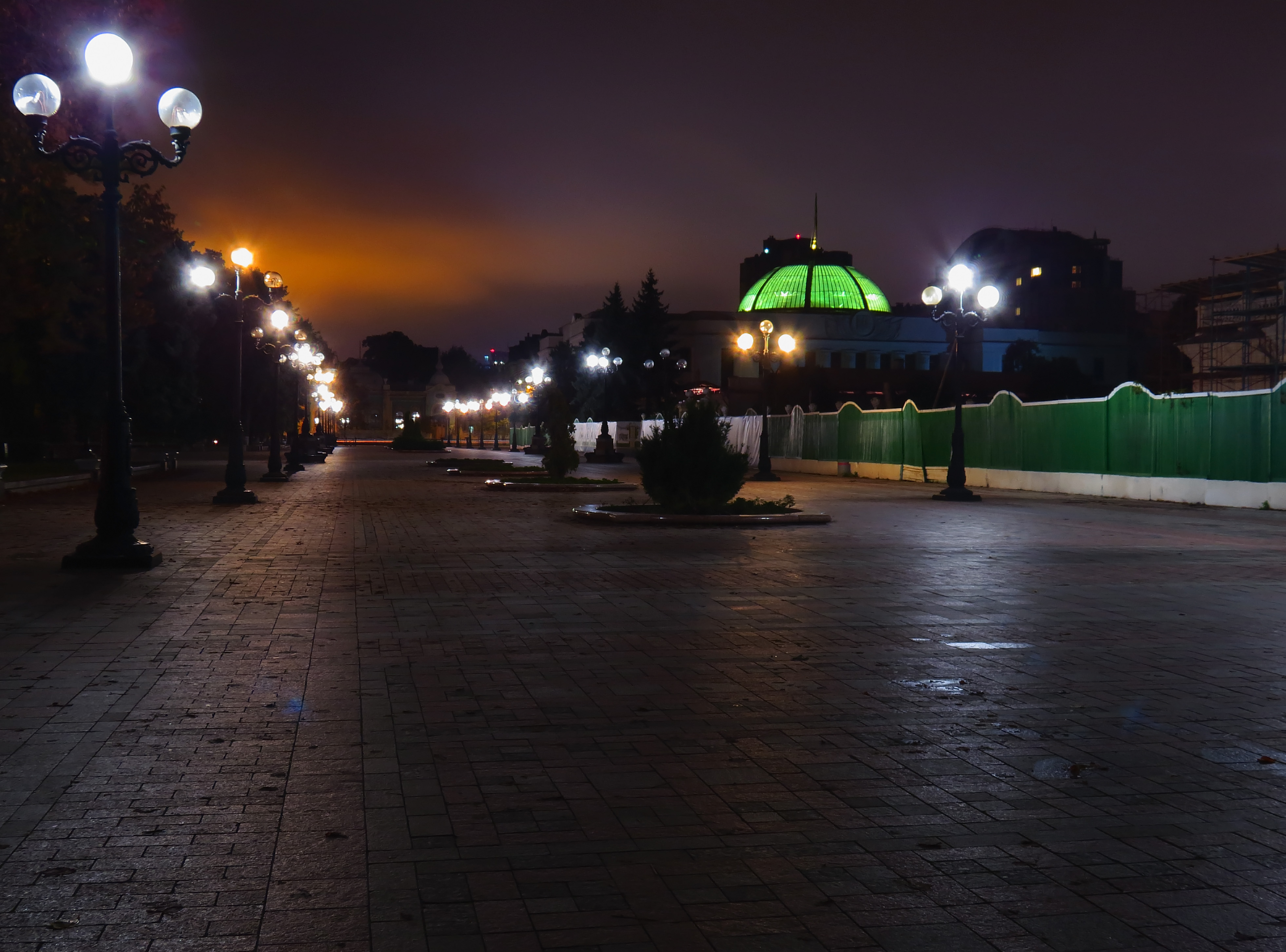
Verkhovna Rada building at night in 2015

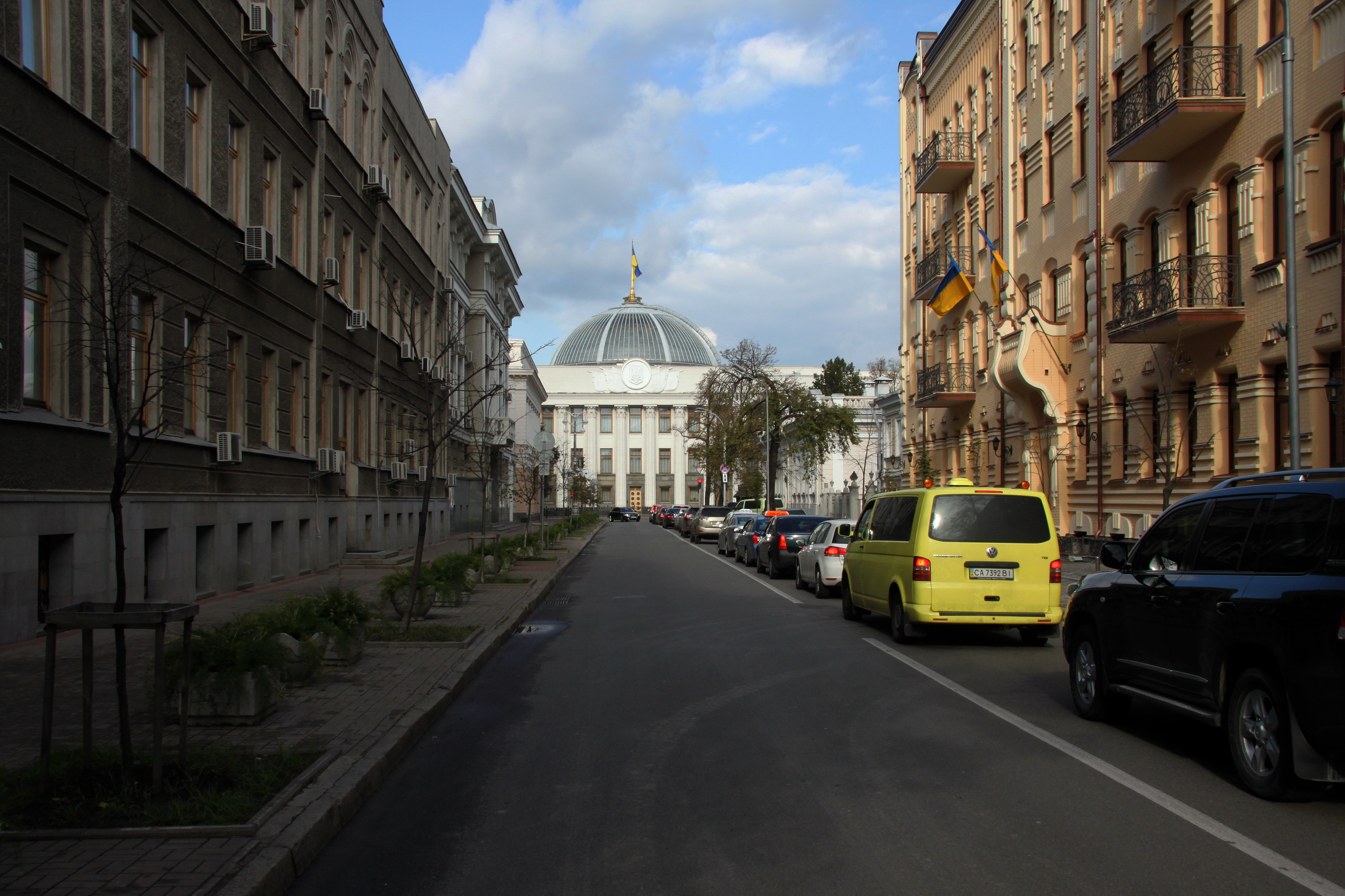
Verkhovna Rada building from Mykhaila Hrushevskoho Street in 2013

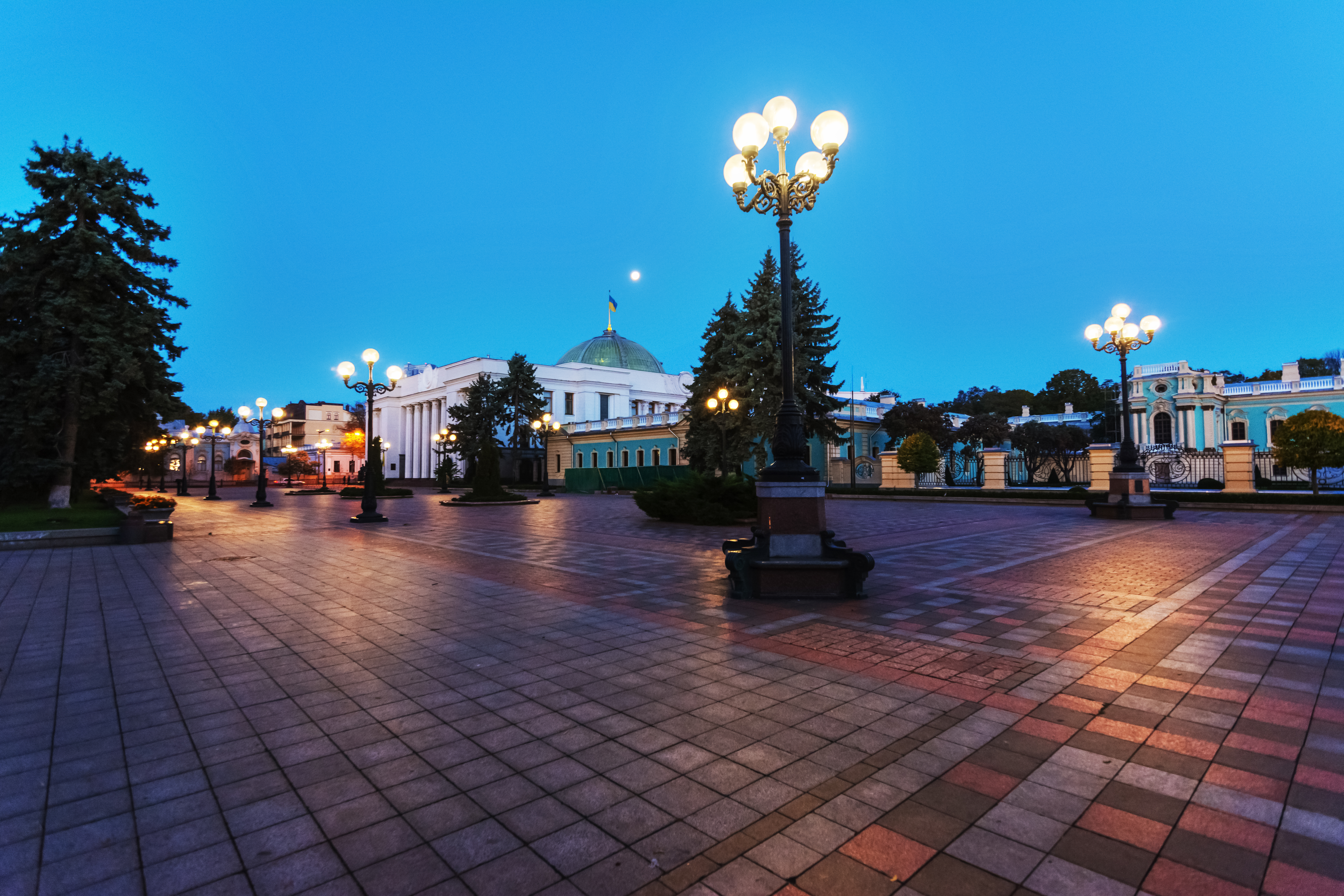
Verkhovna Rada building in 2017

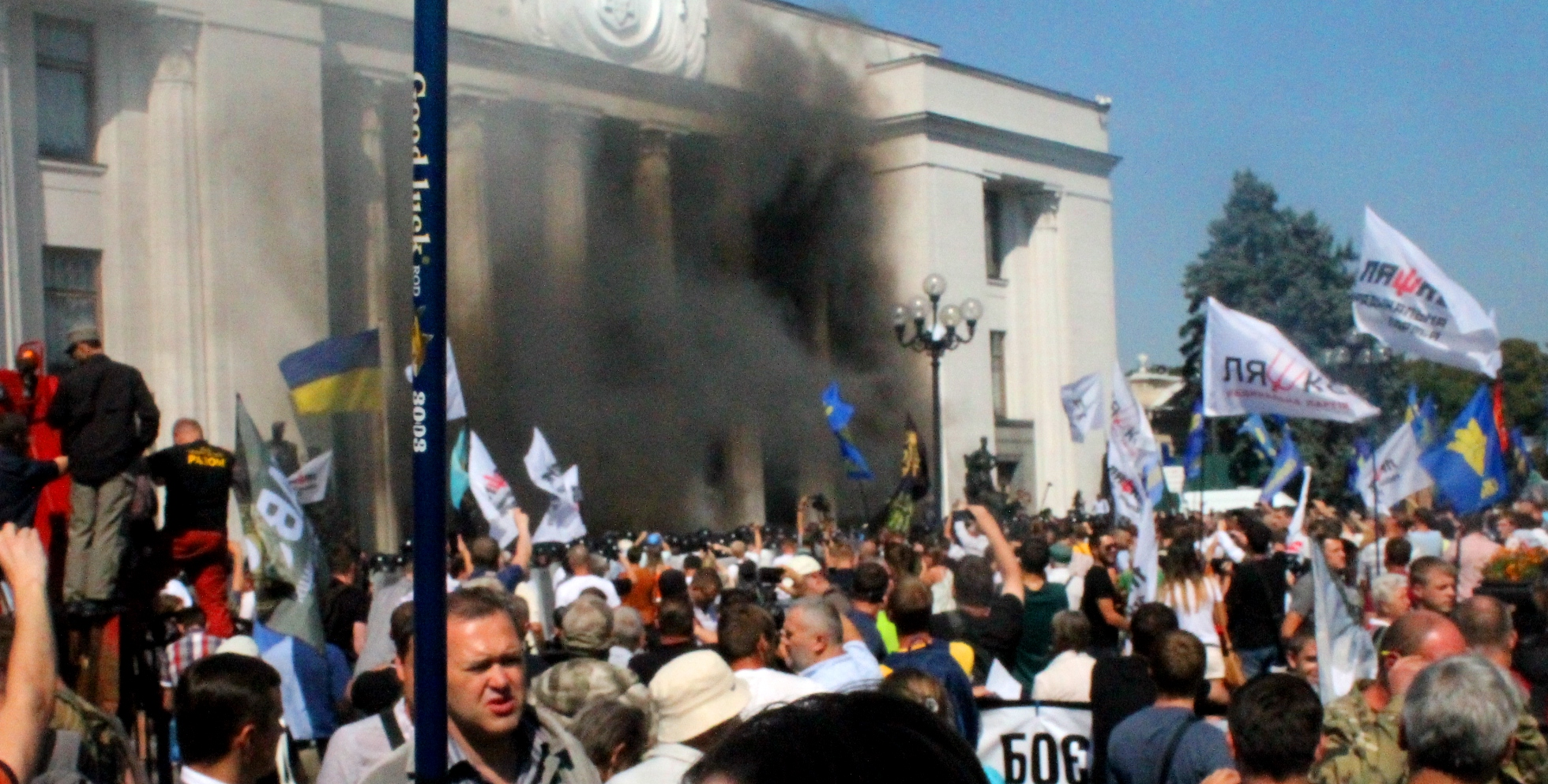
Protests at the Verkhovna Rada building in 2015

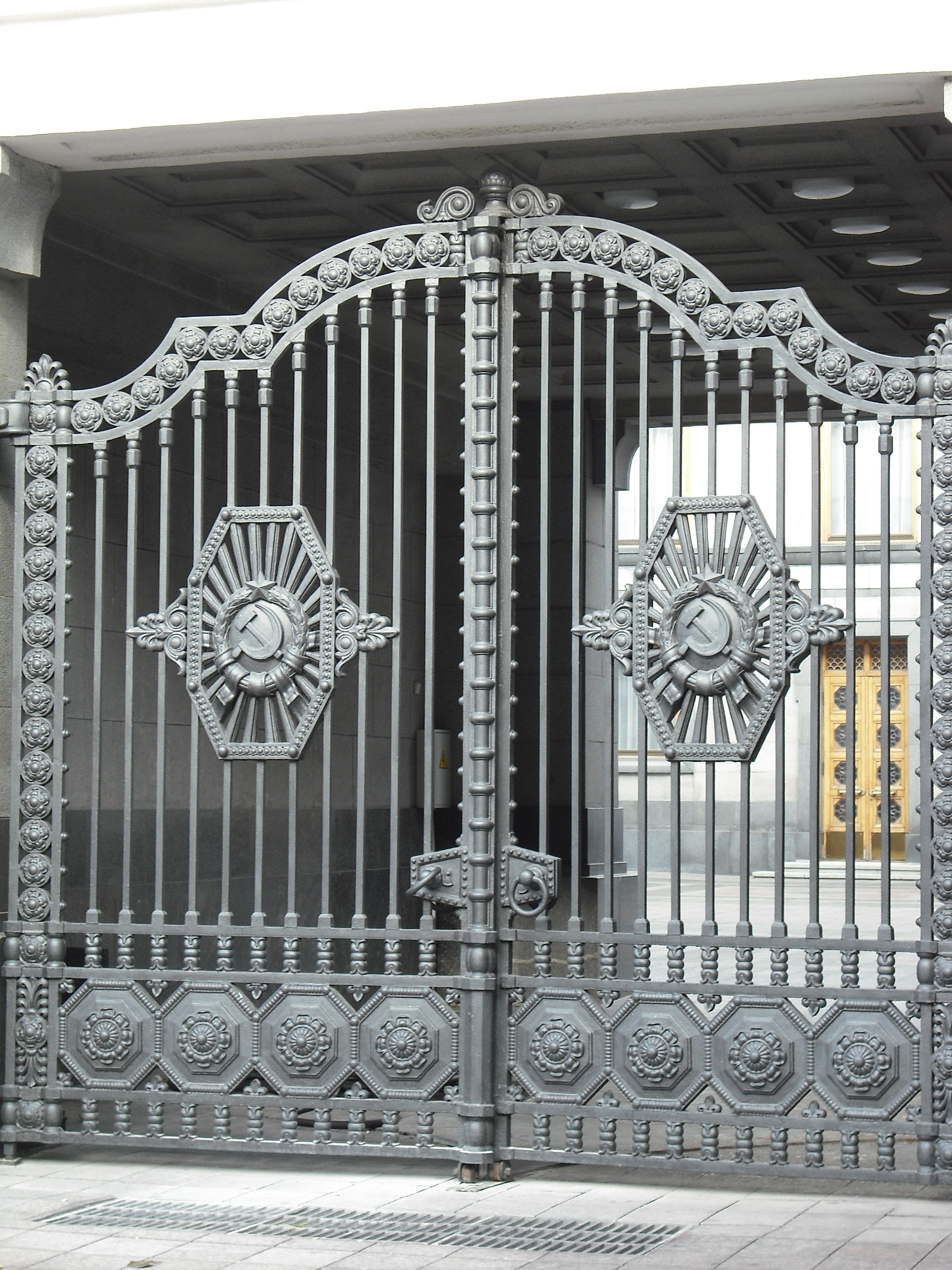
Verkhovna Rada building's gates in 2009 before Decommunization
