= Mariinskyi Palace =

Official residence of the president of Ukraine

- Маріїнський палац
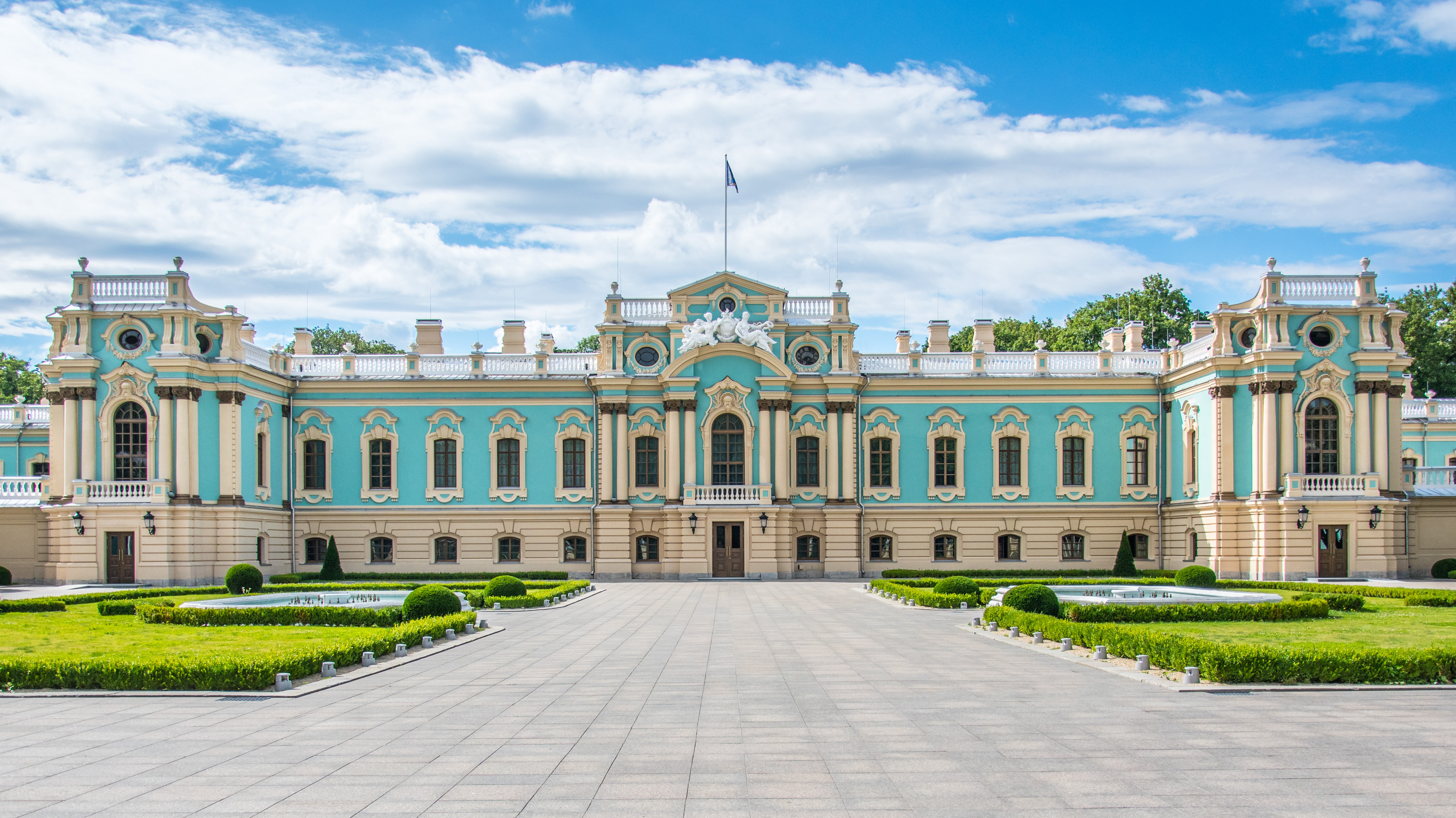
- Façade of the palace

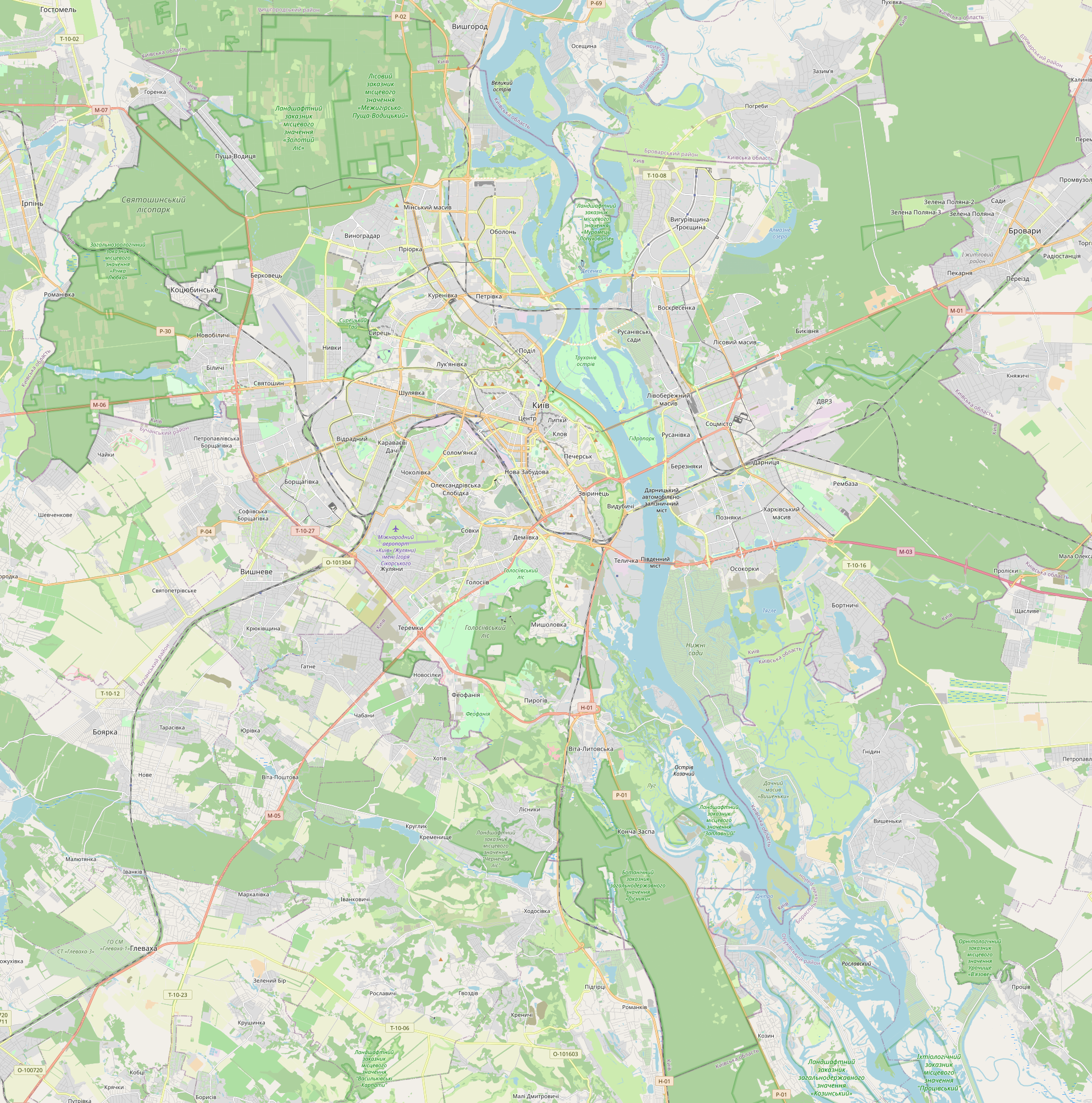
- Location within Ukraine Kyiv Location within Ukraine

General information
- Architectural style: Baroque
- Location: Hrushevsky street 5A, 01008 Kyiv, Ukraine
- Coordinates: 50°26′54″N 30°32′15″E
- Construction started: 1744
- Completed: 1752
- Client: Elizabeth of Russia (House of Romanov)
- Owner: Ukraine

Design and construction
- Architect: Bartolomeo Rastrelli

Immovable Monument of National Significance of Ukraine
- Official name: Маріїнський палац (Mariinskyi Palace)
- Type: Architecture
- Reference no.: 260118

The Mariinskyi Palace (Ukrainian: Маріїнський палац, romanized: Mariinskyi palats) is the official residence of the president of Ukraine. The Elizabethan baroque palace is sited on the right bank of the Dnipro River in Kyiv, Ukraine, adjoining the neo-classical building of the Verkhovna Rada, the parliament of Ukraine.

== History ==
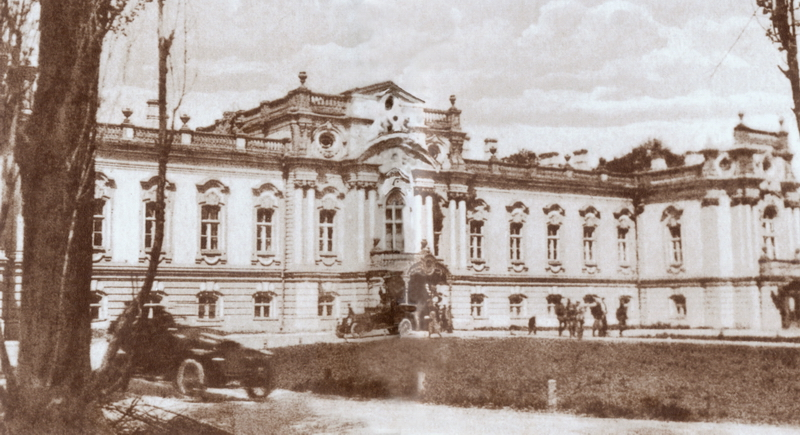
The Mariinskyi Palace as it appeared in 1918

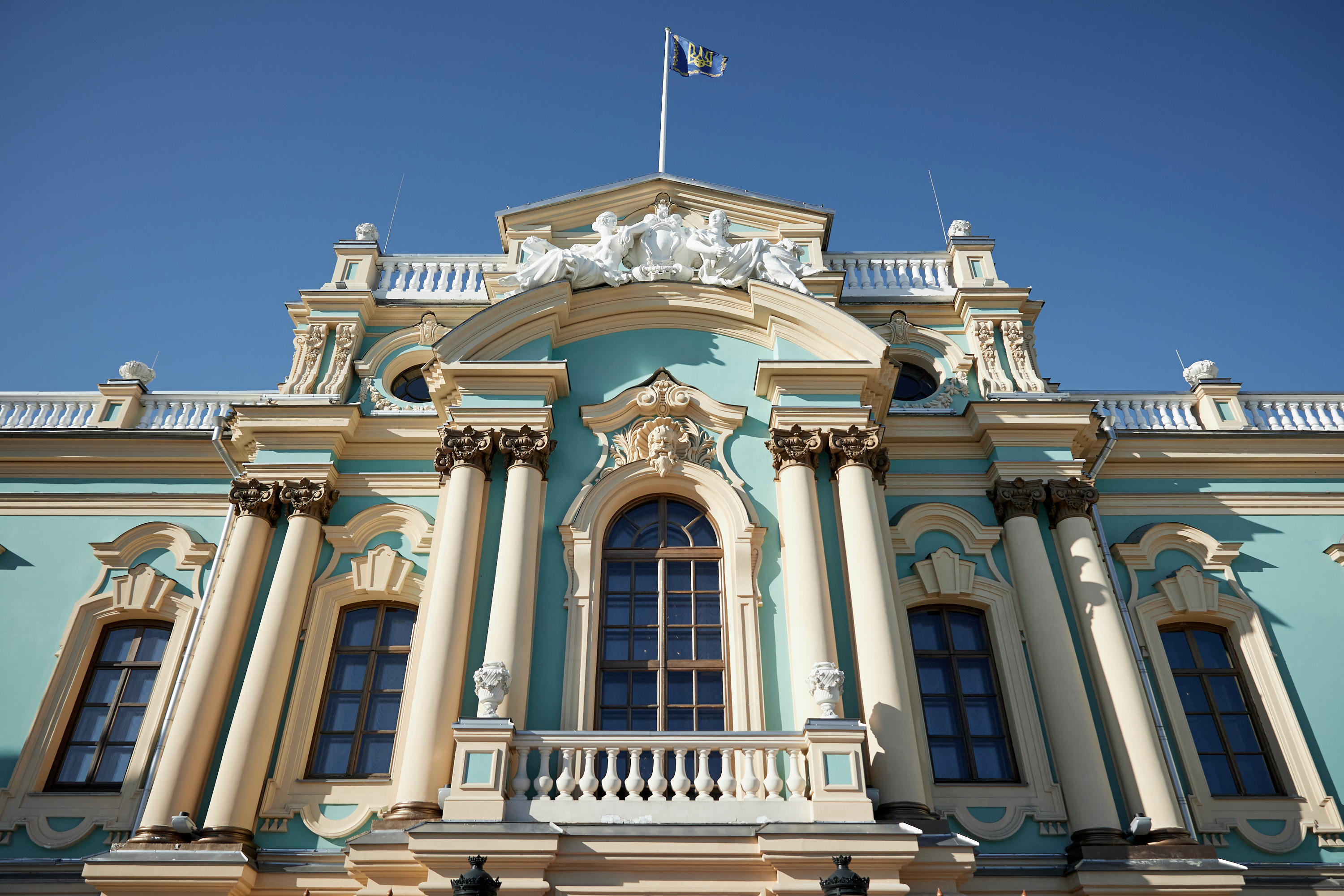
The presidential standard flying over the Mariinskyi Palace

The palace was constructed by command of the Russian empress Elizaveta Petrovna in 1744; her architect was Bartolomeo Rastrelli, the most eminent architect working in the Russian Empire at that time. One of the students of Rastrelli, Ivan Michurin, together with a group of other architects, completed the palace in 1752. Empress Elizabeth, however, did not live to see the palace completed; the first senior-ranking member of the imperial family to stay in the palace was Empress Elizabeth's niece-in-law, Empress Catherine II, who visited Kyiv in 1787. In the late 18th and early 19th centuries, the palace was the main residence of the governors-general.

In the early 19th century, the palace burned down in a series of fires, and was in total disrepair and abandoned for almost half a century. In 1870, Emperor Alexander II had the palace reconstructed by the architect Konstantin Mayevsky, using old drawings and watercolours as a guide. It was then renamed after the reigning Empress Maria Alexandrovna. By her wish, a large park was established off the southern side of the palace. The palace was used as a residence for visiting members of the Imperial Family until 1917.

During the years of the Russian Civil War in 1917–1920, the palace was used as the Kyiv revkom headquarters, particularly during the Kyiv Bolshevik Uprising. In the 1920s, the building belonged to an agricultural school, soon after which it became a museum. The Mariinskyi was badly damaged during the Second World War, and was restored at the end of the 1940s. Another major restoration was completed in the early 1980s.

=== Modern residence ===
In June 2007, the reconstruction of the palace began, which was expected to be completed by 2011, but as of 2017, was still ongoing. On 5 April 2022 President Volodymyr Zelenskyy announced that the White Hall of the Mariinskyi Palace, where the state leadership receives heads of foreign states, would be called the White Hall of Heroes of Ukraine, and those who have been awarded the title of Hero of Ukraine would be awarded here.

== In popular culture ==
The music video for the song "Naatu Naatu" from the 2022 Indian Telugu language film RRR was filmed at Mariinskyi Palace in August 2021. The song won the 2022 Golden Globe Award for Best Original Song and the 95th Academy Award for Best Original Song.

== Gallery ==
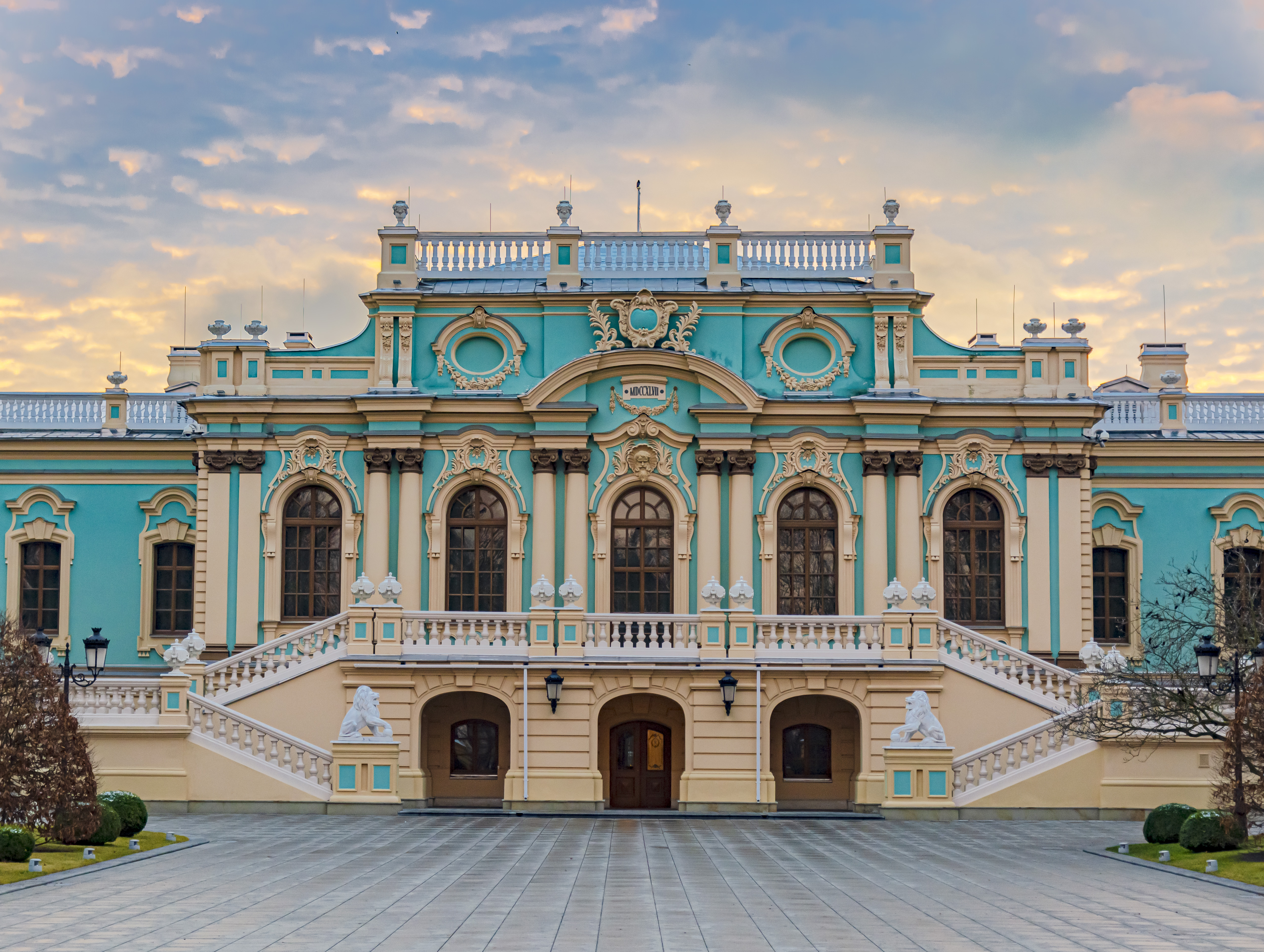
View of the rear of the palace from its gardens

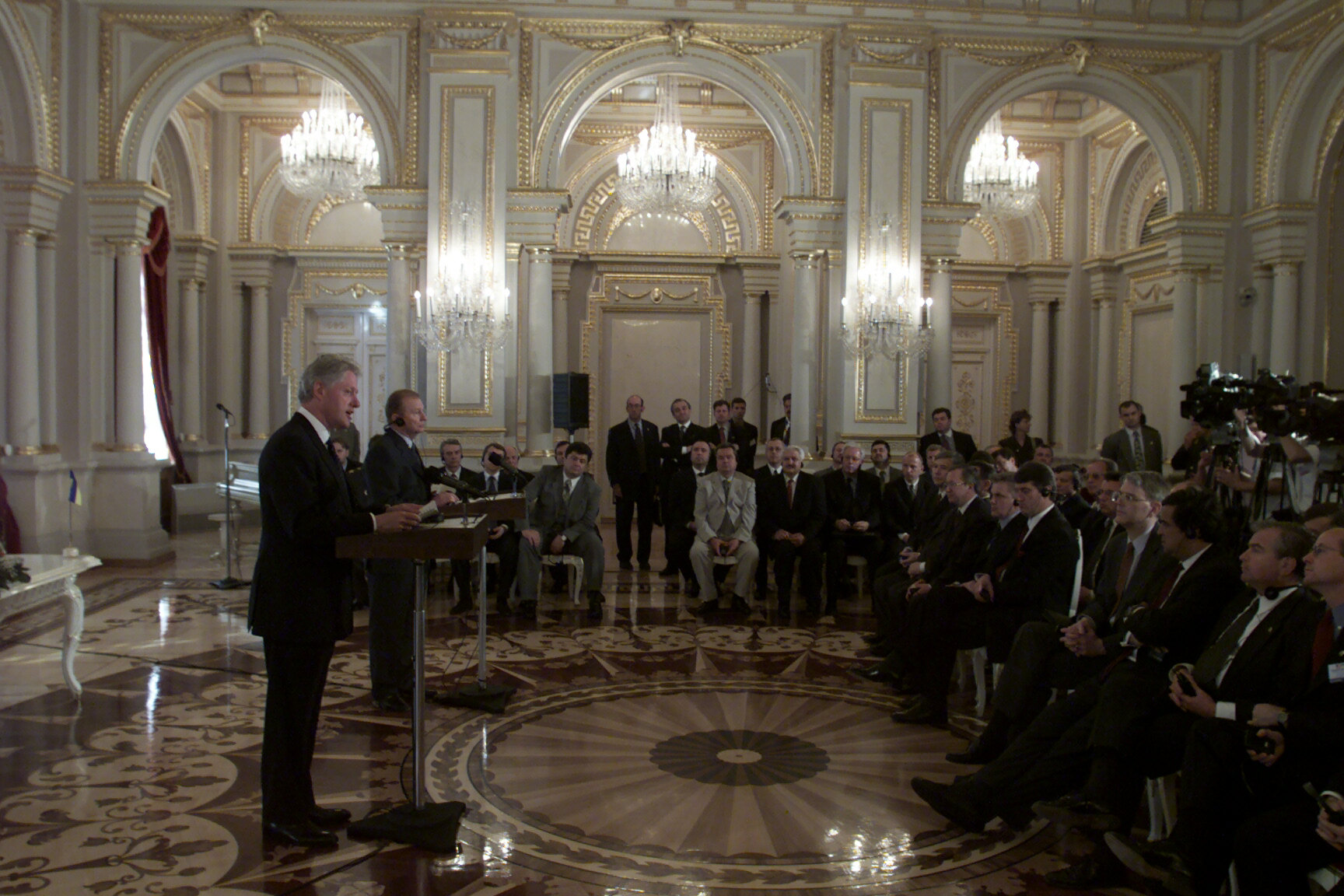
Inside. President Kuchma talks with United States President Clinton, 5 June 2000.

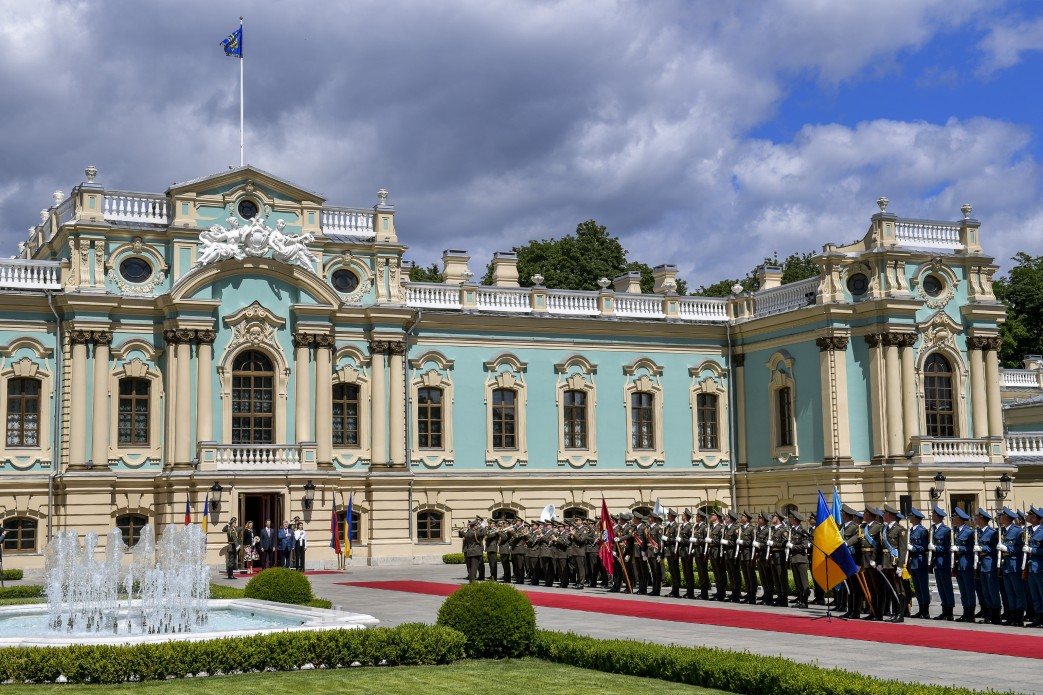
The official visit of Hereditary Prince Alois of Liechtenstein to Kyiv in June 2018

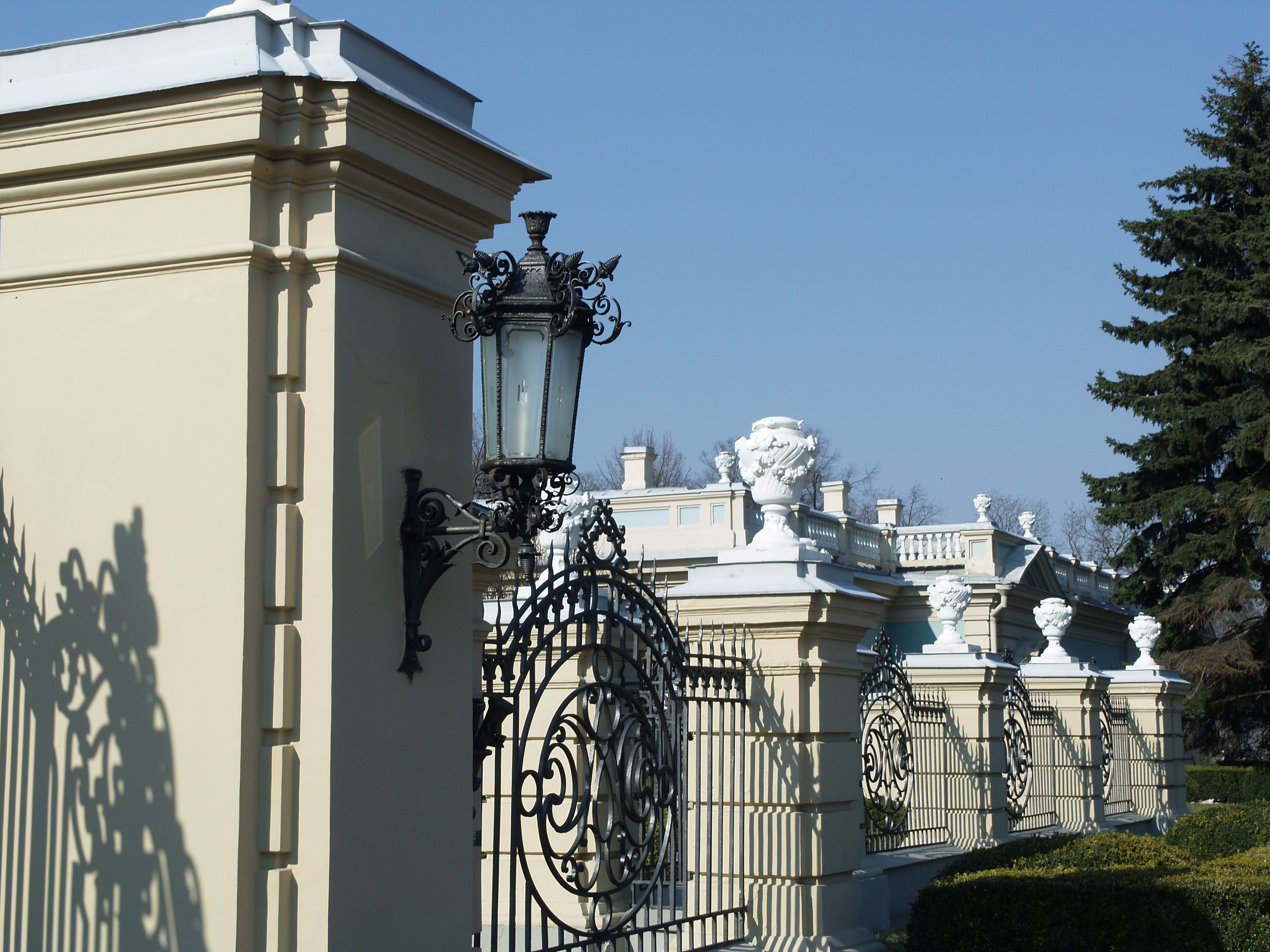
The palace is surrounded by intricate iron railings.

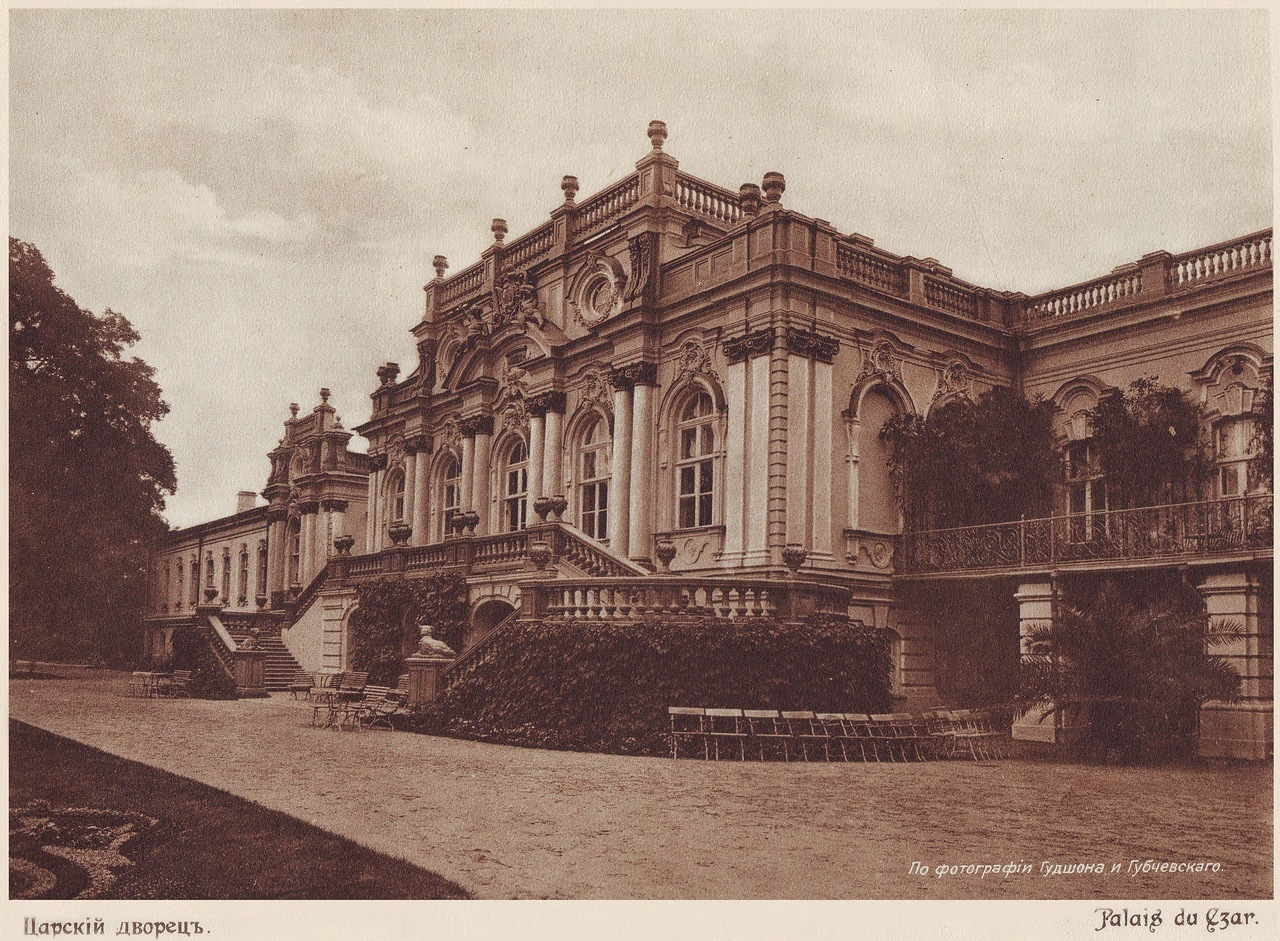
The Mariinskyi Palace in 1911

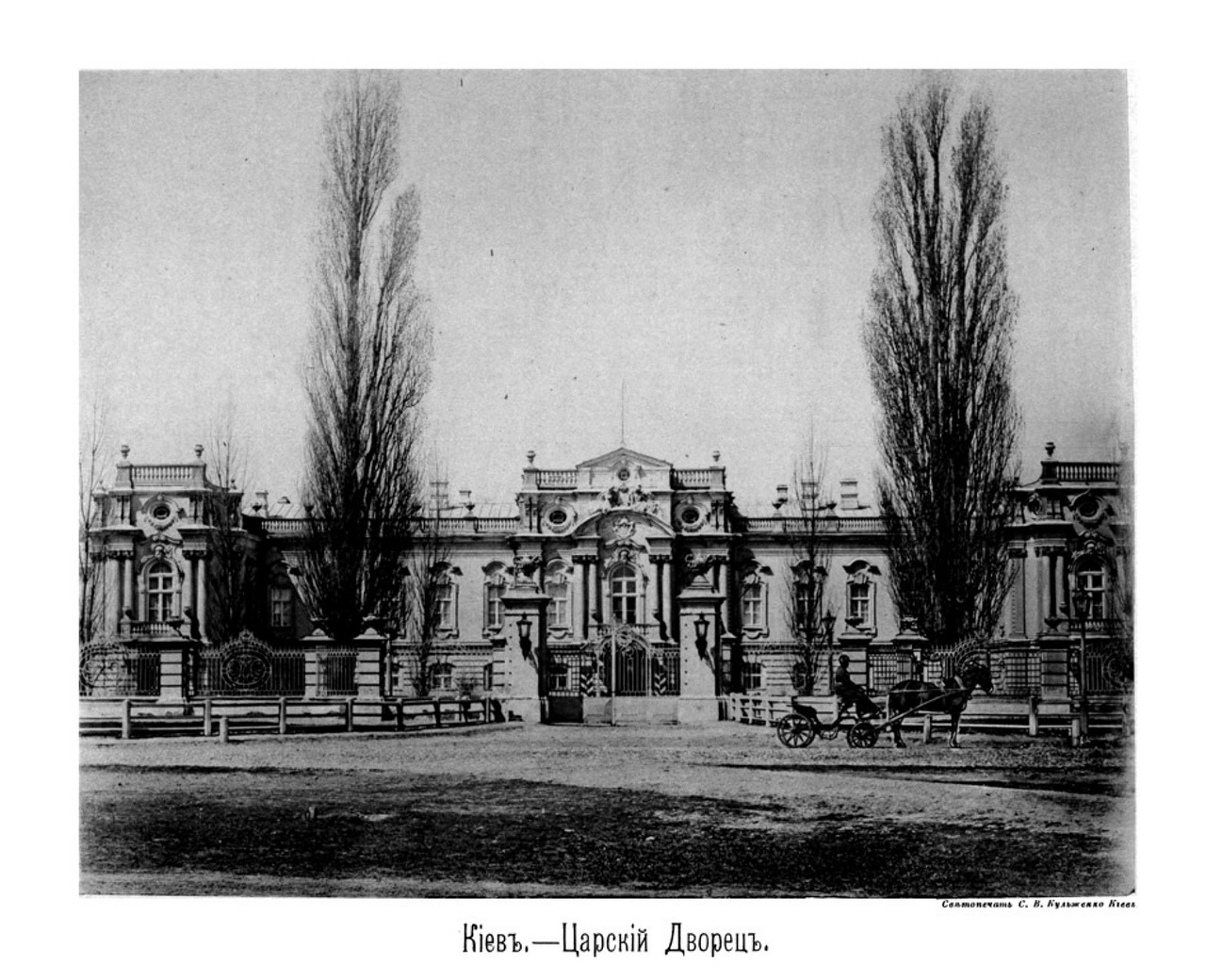
The Mariinskyi Palace in 1888

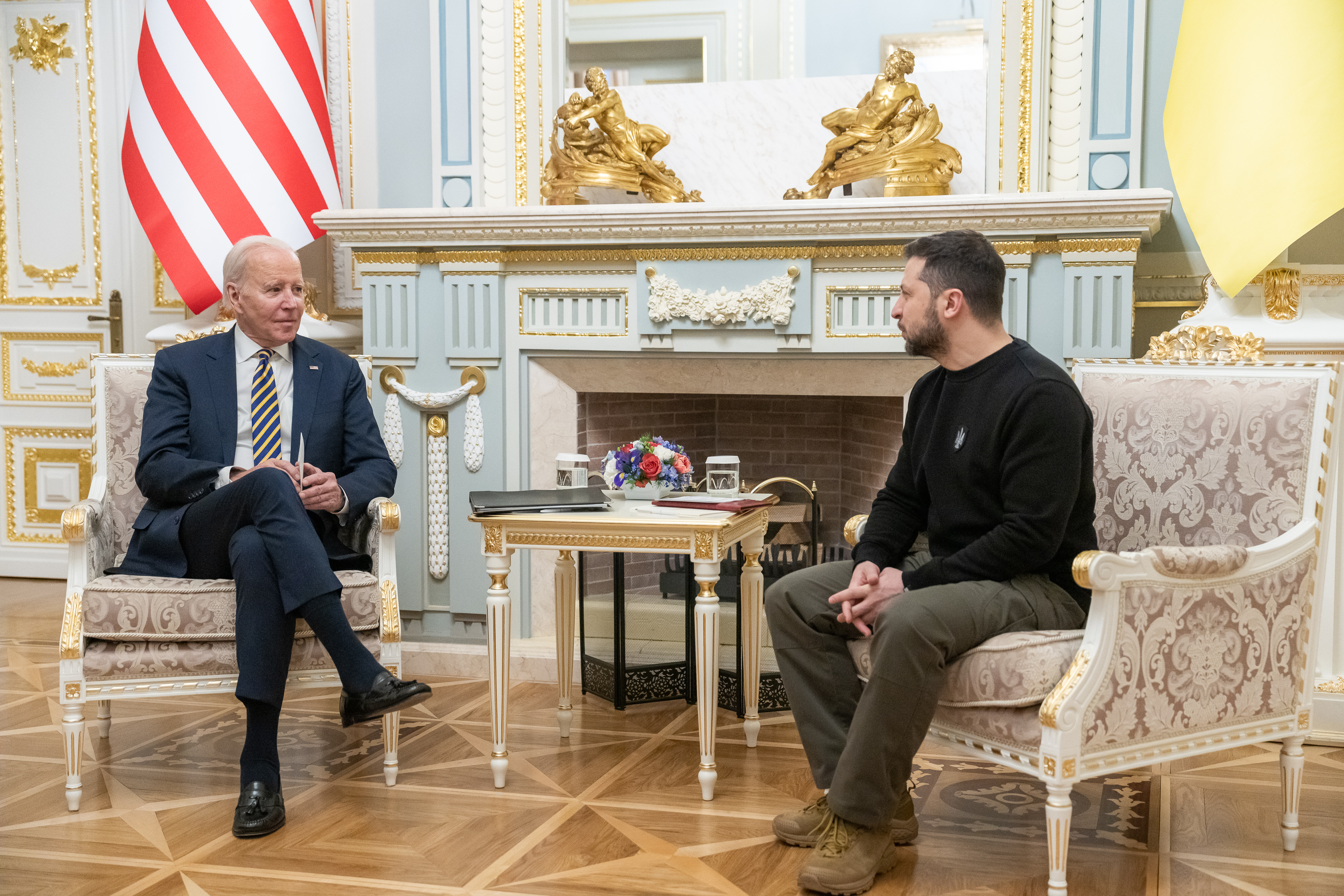
US President Joe Biden with Ukrainian President Volodymyr Zelenskyy in Kyiv, 20 February 2023

== See also ==
- List of Baroque residences
- Klov Palace — another Baroque palace in Kyiv
