= Oleksandr Verbytskyi =

Ukrainian architect

Oleksandr Matviyovych Verbytskyi (Ukrainian: Олександр Матвійович Вербицький; 27 September 1875–9 November 1958) was a Ukrainian architect and pedagogue, known as one of the founders of Ukrainian Art Nouveau.

Born in Sevastopol, in 1898 Verbytskyi graduated from the St. Petersburg Institute of Civil Engineers. Starting from 1901, he worked as an architect at the central office of Southwestern Railways, remaining on that post until 1933. In 1919 Verbytskyi started lecturing at the Kyiv Institute of Engineering and Construction and the Kyiv Architectural Institute, both of which were in 1924 merged into the Kyiv Arts Institute.

Verbytskyi created his most prominent works in the rationalist Art Nouveau style. Along with Valerian Rykov, Vasyl Krychevskyi and Pavlo Alioshyn, he became one of the founders of a new national school in Ukrainian architecture. Among his most notable buildings are the grain elevator in Odesa, sugar plant in Verkhniachka, paper mill in Malyn and several residential buildings in Kyiv. Verbytskyi also authored the project of Kyiv railway station, built in 1928-1932; however his vision was not realized to a full extent, and the building's interior was eventiually realized in a Soviet classicist style after World War II, despite the architect's protests.

Among Verbytskyi's pupils were prominent architects Volodymyr Zabolotnyi, Yuri Aseyev, Anatoly Dobrovolskyi, Petro Yurchenko, Yevheniya Marynchenko, Dmytro Yablonskyi and Nataliya Chmutina. In 1956 he became an honorary member of the Academy of Construction and Architecture of Ukrainian SSR. He died in 1958 in Kyiv.

== Works ==
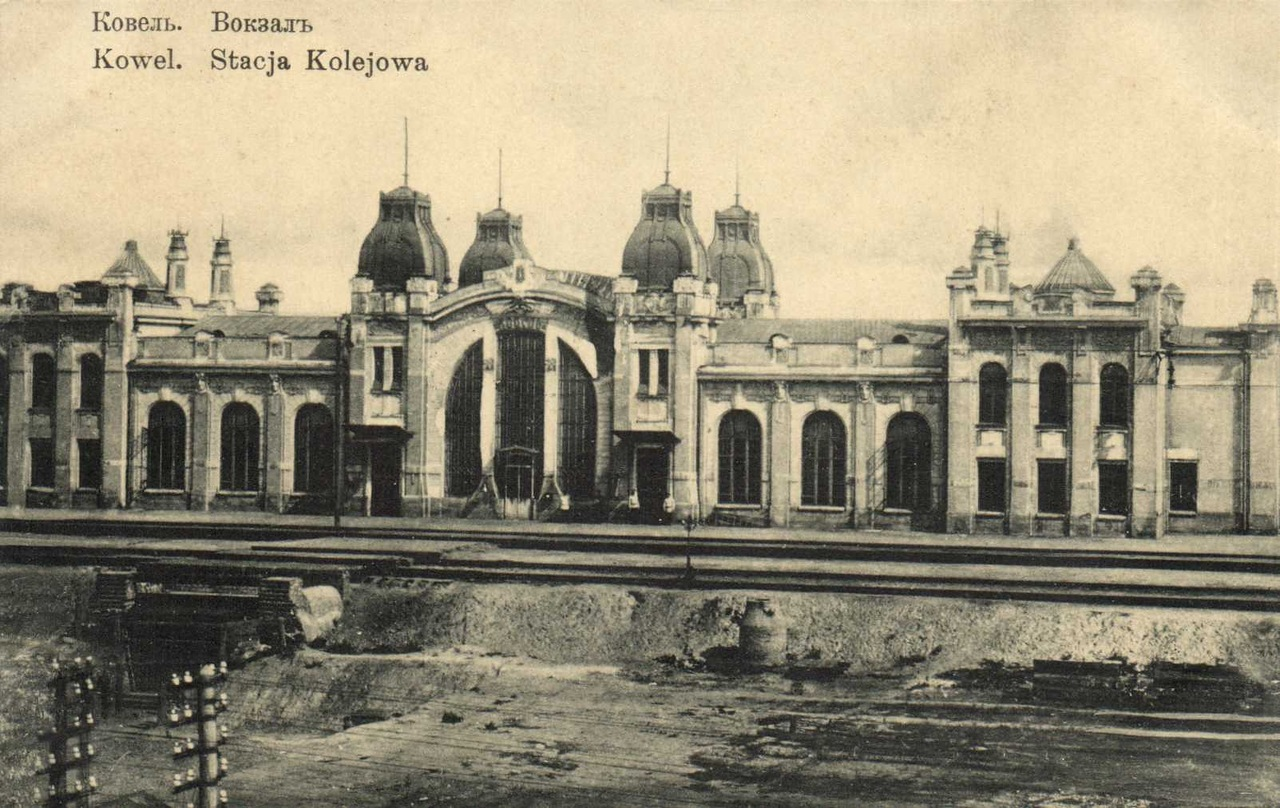
Kovel railway station (destroyed in World War II)

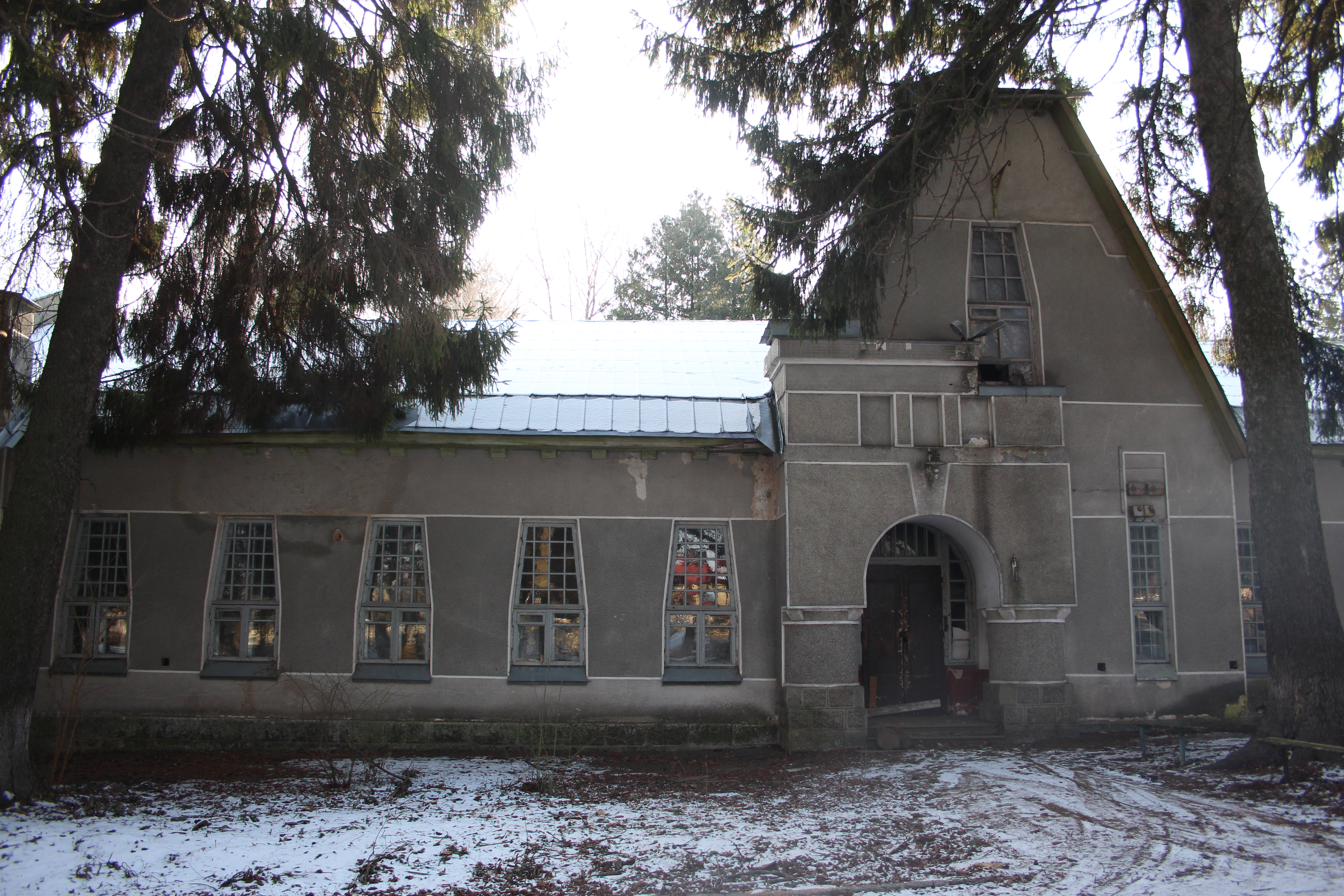
Sugar factory in Verkhniachka

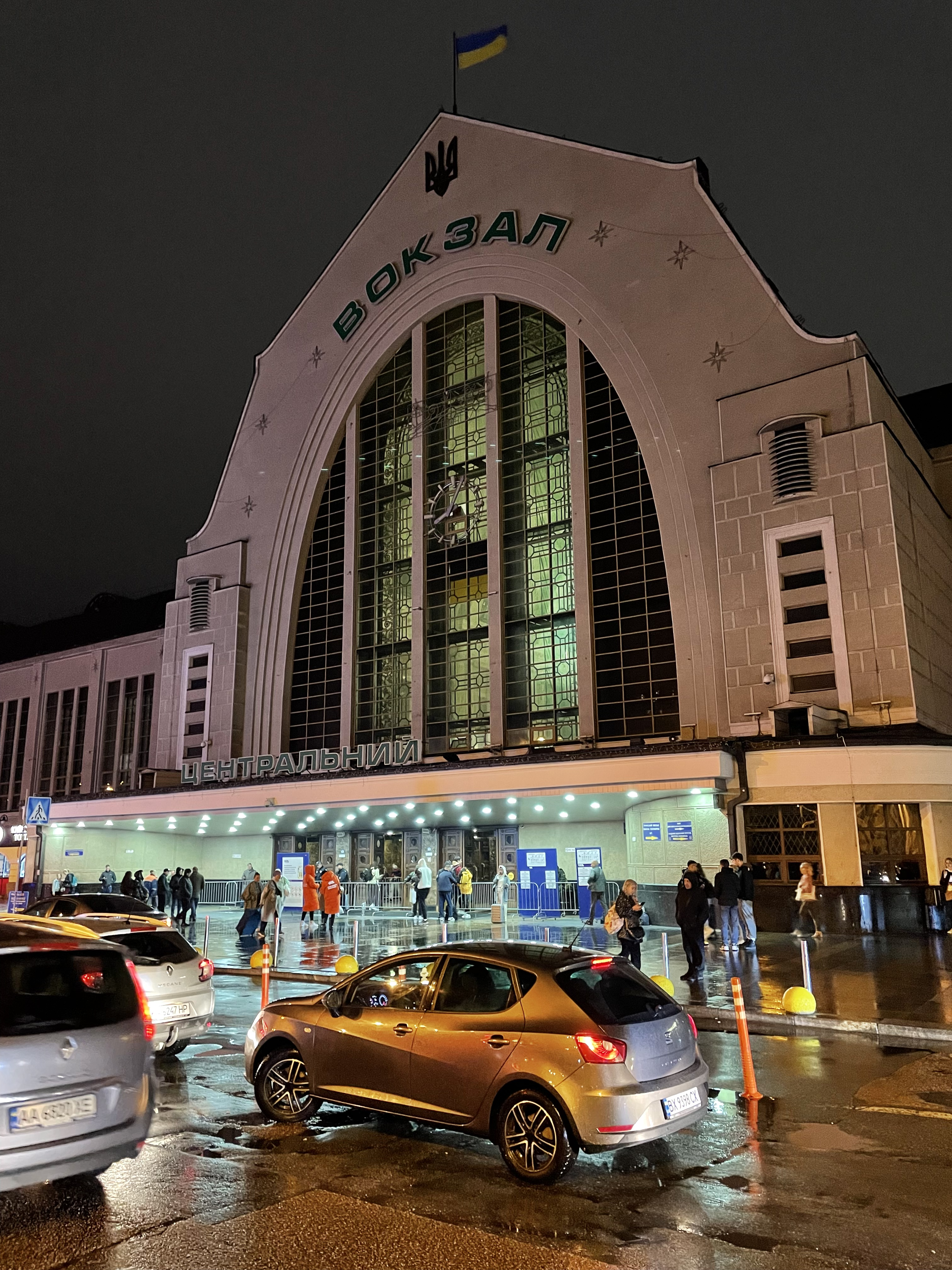
Kyiv railway station

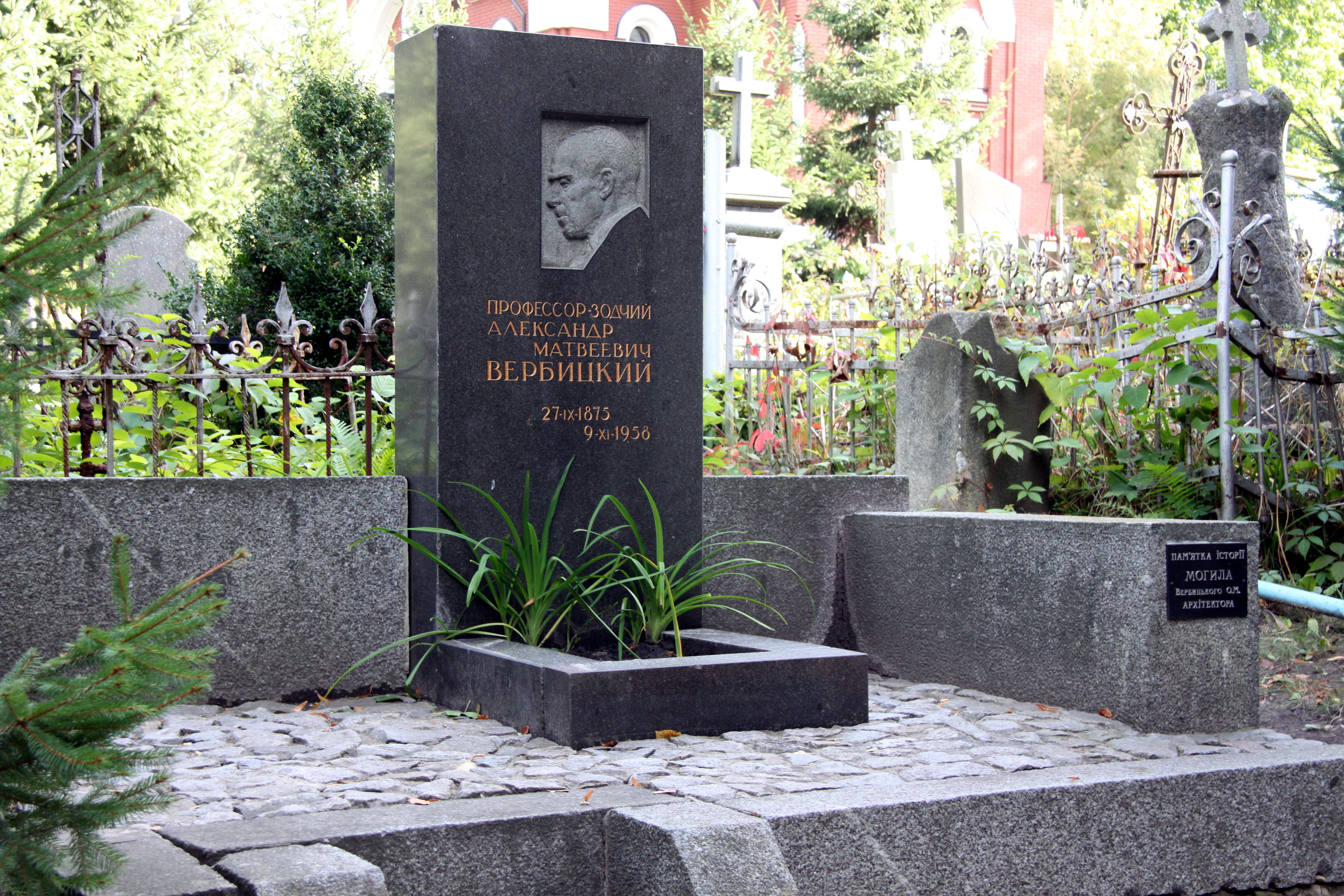
Grave of Verbytskyi at Lukyanivka Cemetery in Kyiv
