= List of hotels in Ukraine =

This is a list of notable hotels and inns in Ukraine.

== Chernihiv ==
- Hotel Ukraina
- Hotel Hradecky
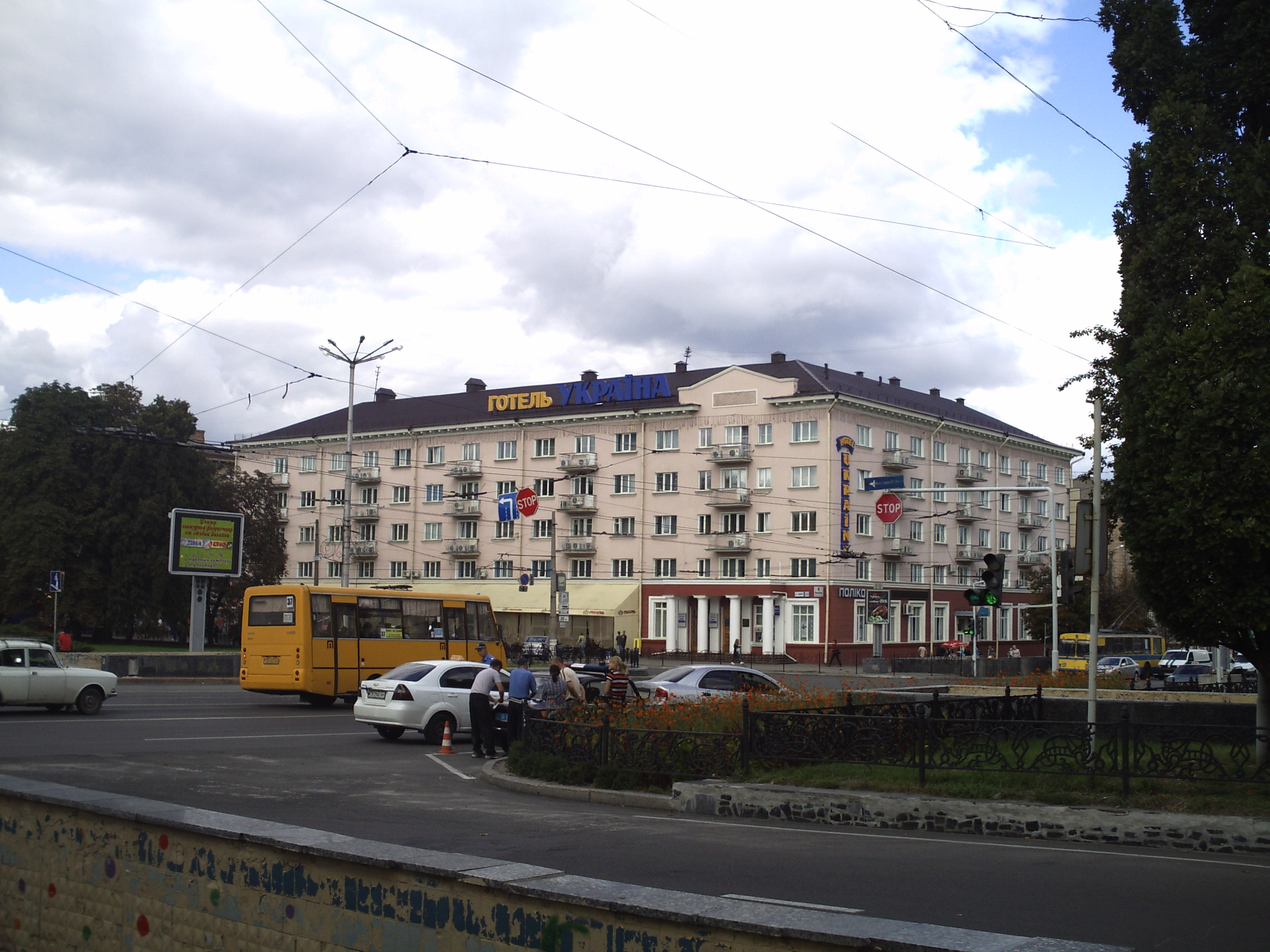
Hotel Ukraina

== Donetsk ==
- Donbass Palace

== Kyiv ==
- Hotel Ukrayina
- President Hotel
- InterContinental Kyiv
- Opera Hotel
- Hotel Dnipro
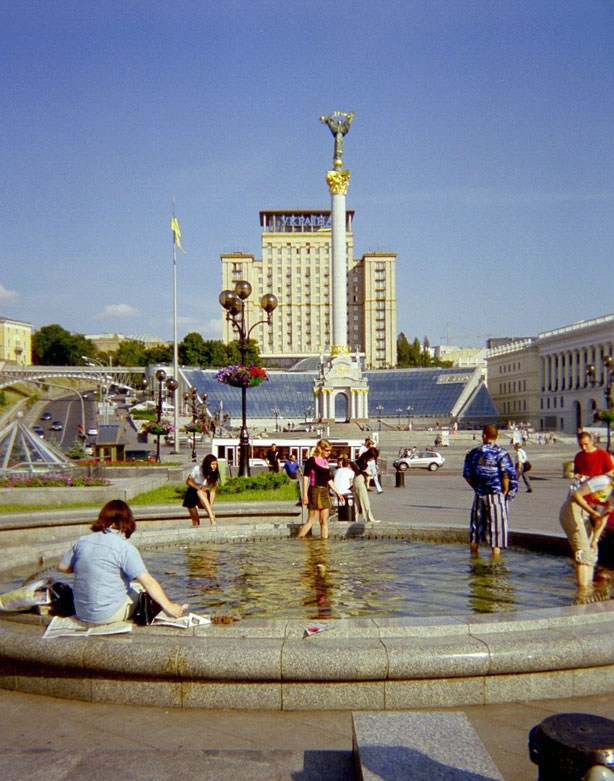
Hotel Ukrayina

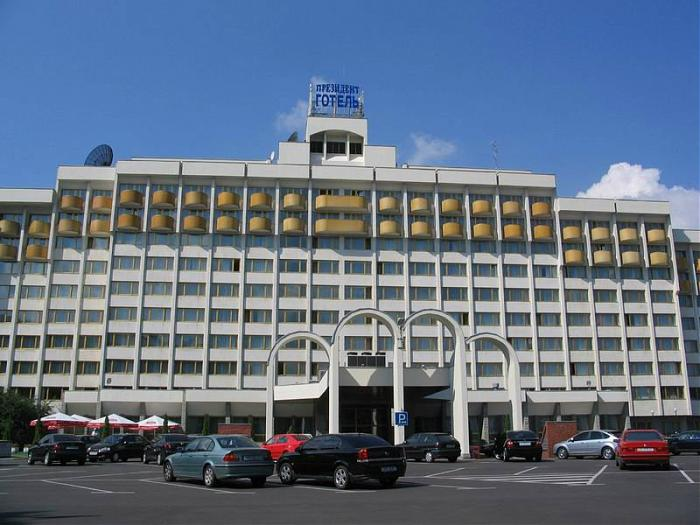
President Hotel

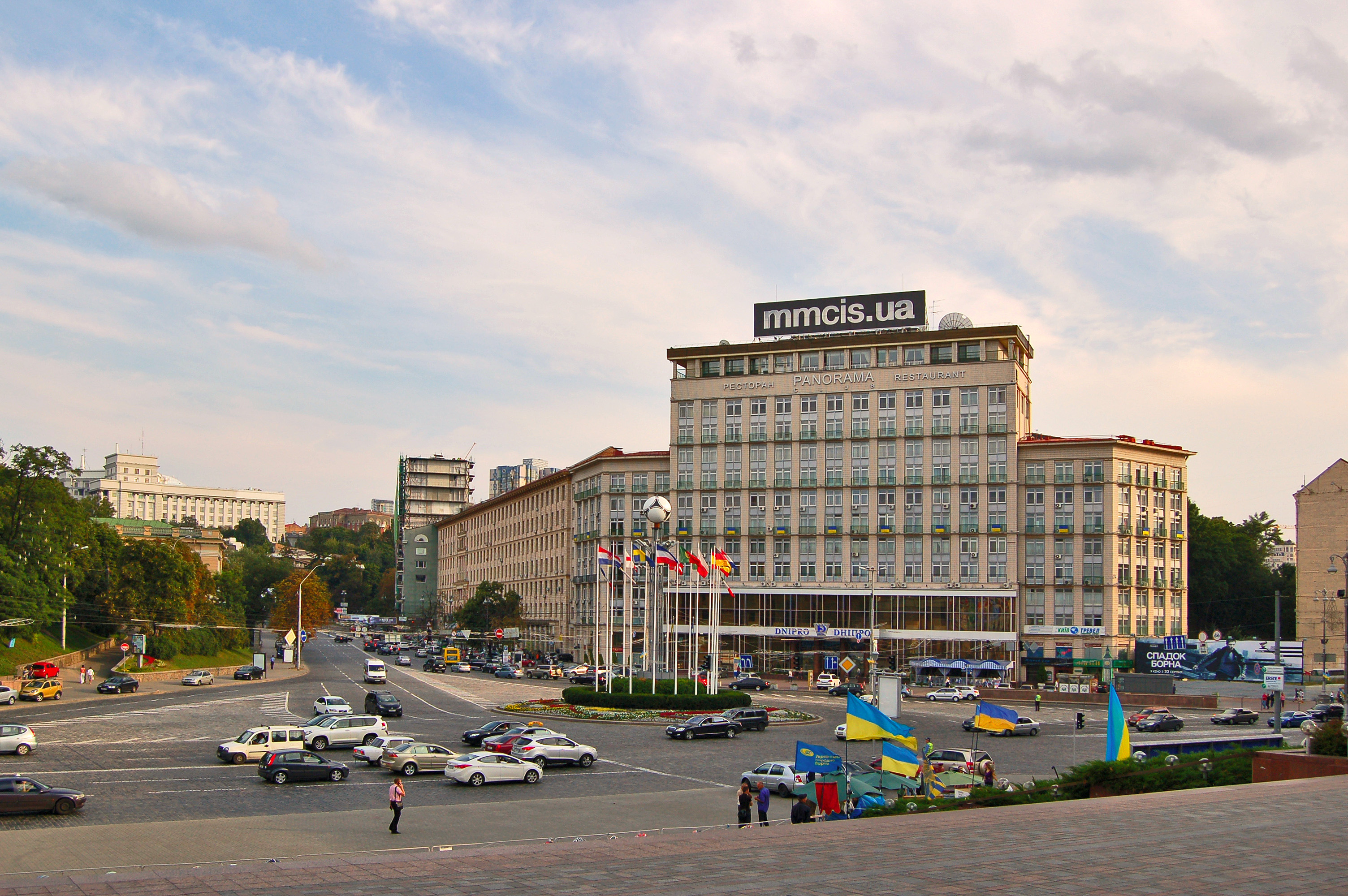
Hotel Dnipro

== Lviv ==
- Hotel George
- Grand Hotel
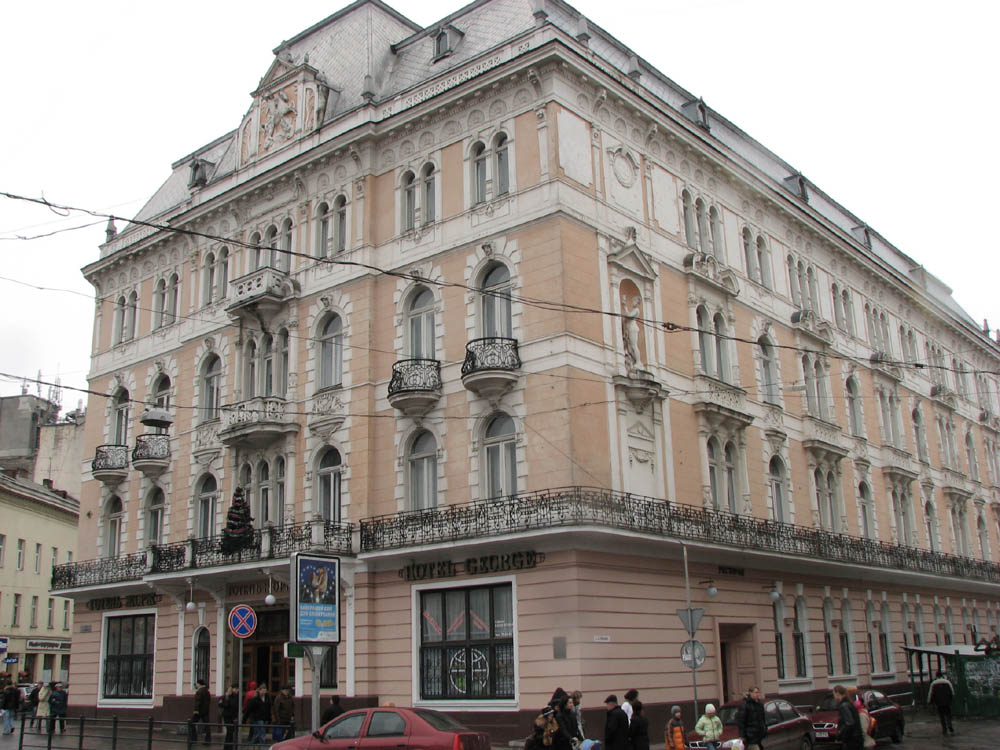
Hotel George

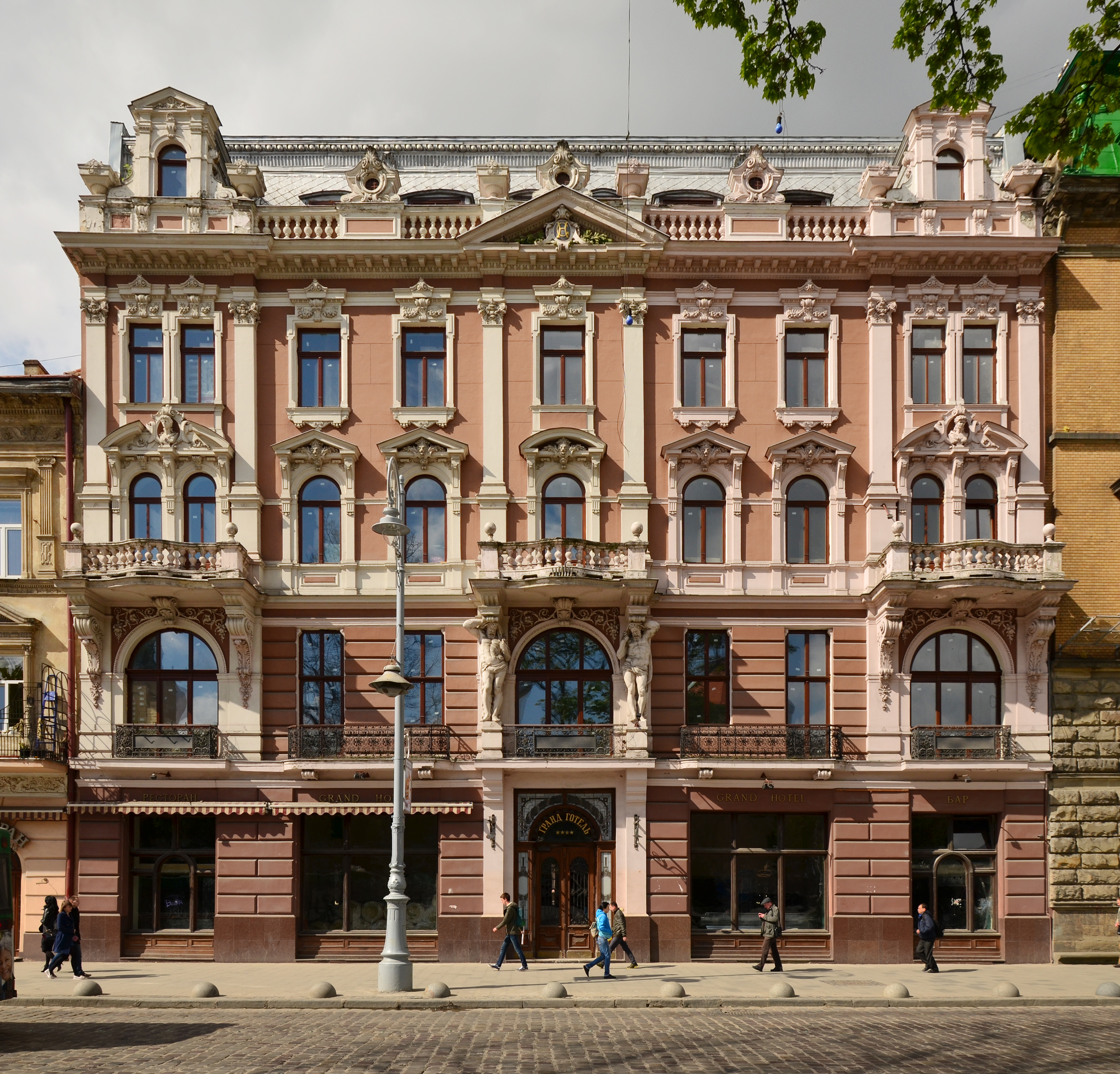
Grand Hotel in Lviv

== Odesa ==
- Bristol Hotel
- Londonskaya Hotel
- Odesa Passage
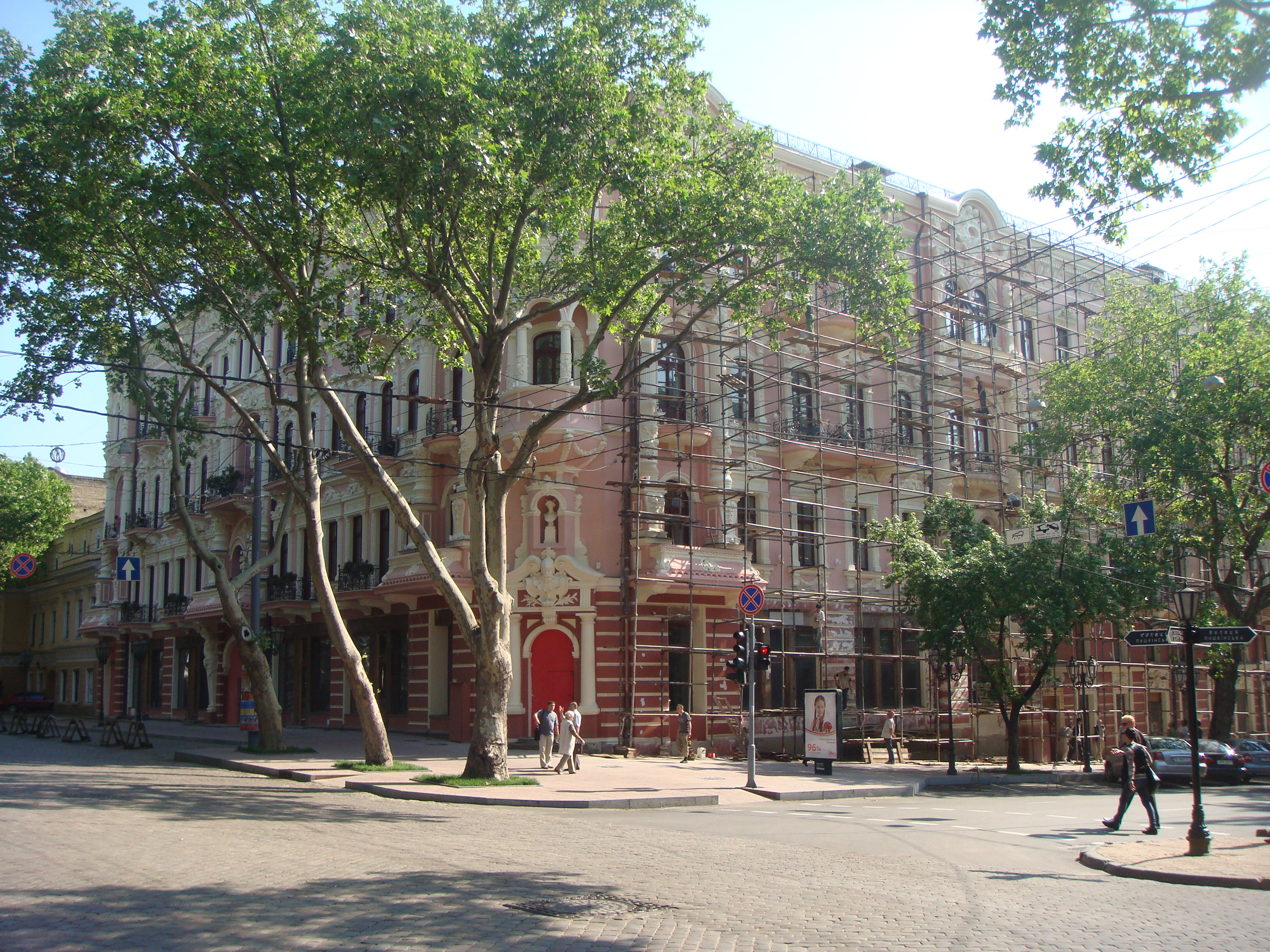
Bristol Hotel

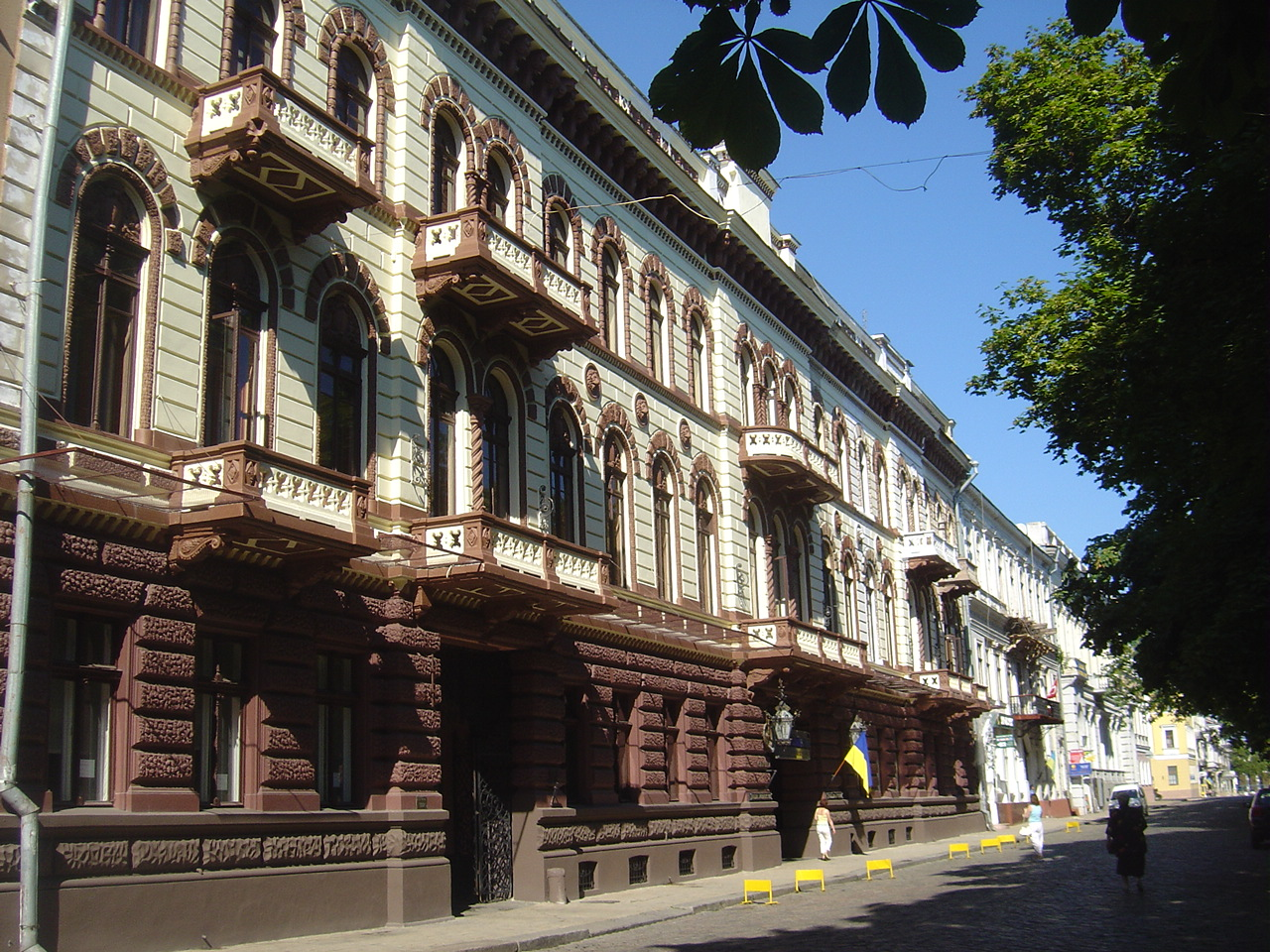
Londonskaya Hotel

== Yalta ==
- Oreanda Hotel
- Villa Elena Hotel
- Yalta Hotel Complex

== Defunct ==
=== Pripyat ===
- Polissya hotel
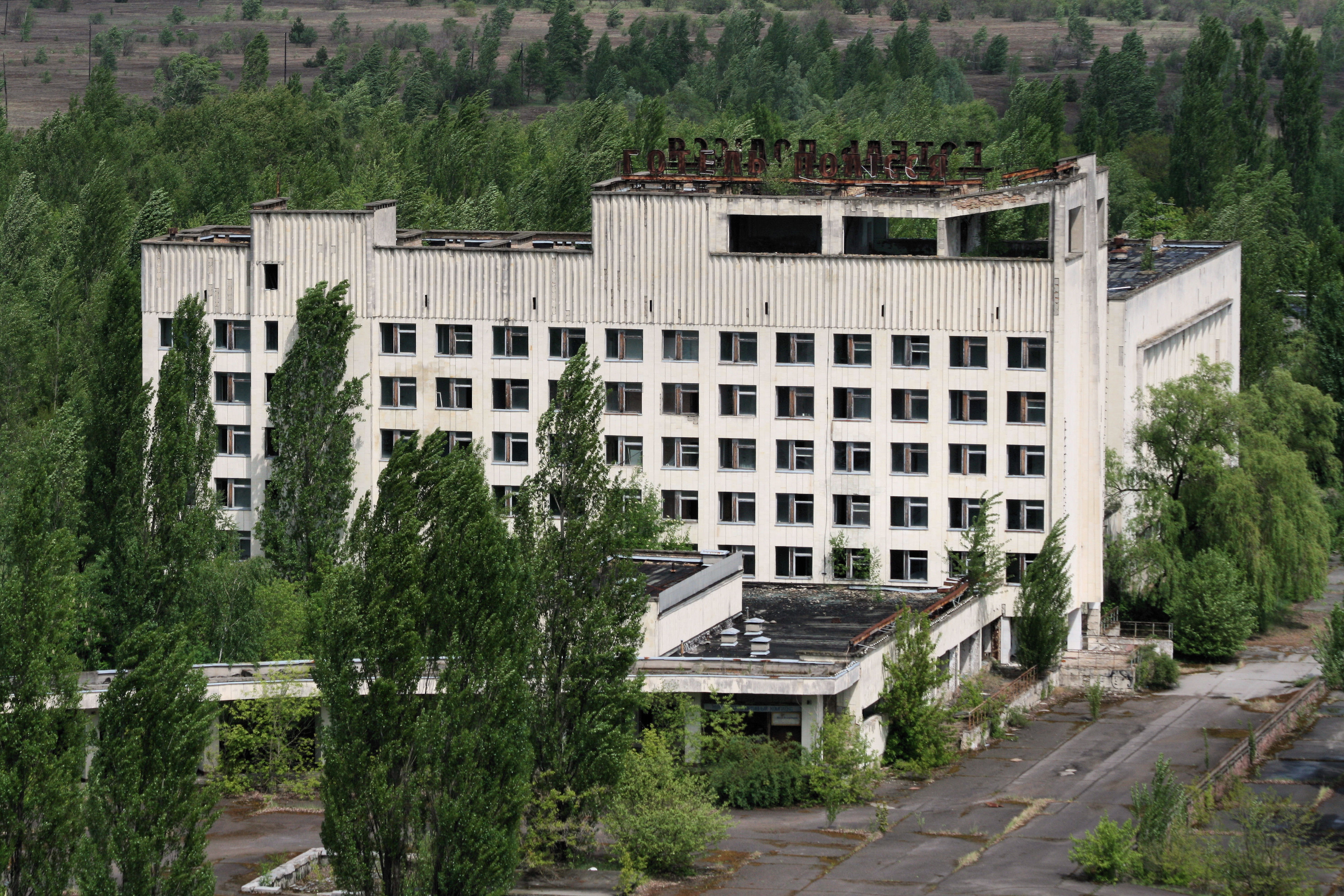
Polissya hotel

== See also ==
- Lists of hotels – an index of hotel list articles on Wikipedia
