= Palace "Ukraine" =

Event venue in Kyiv, Ukraine

National Palace of Arts Ukraina
- Національний палац мистецтв "Україна"
- Palace Ukraina
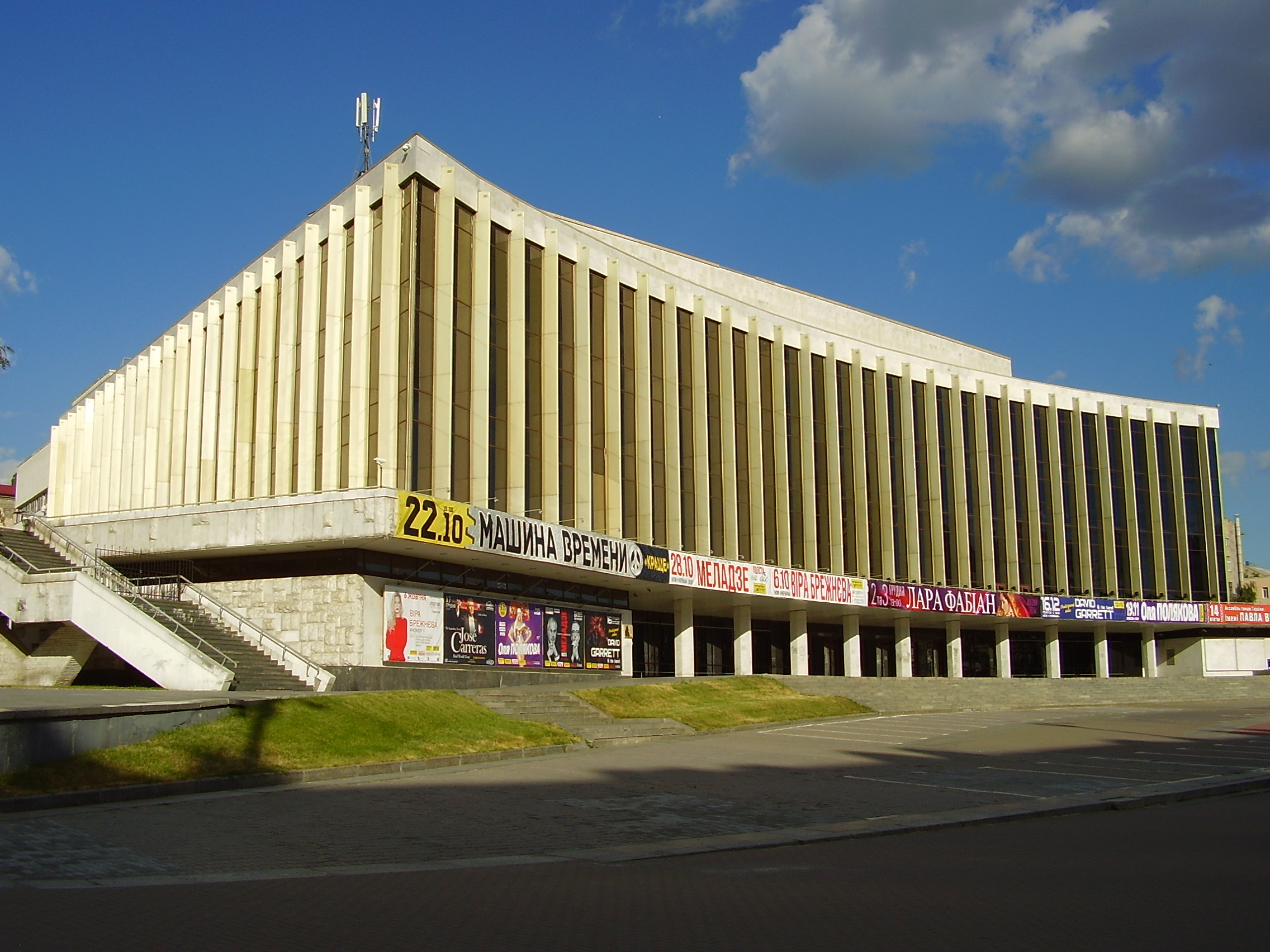
- Interactive map of National Palace of Arts Ukraina
- Address: Velyka Vasylkivska Street 103
- Location: Pechersk Raion, Kyiv, Ukraine
- Coordinates: 50°25′20.31″N 30°31′16.7″E
- Owner: State Management of Affairs
- Capacity: 3,714 (main hall); 240 (small hall)
- Type: Concert hall

Construction
- Built: 1965–1970
- Opened: 17 April 1970
- Renovated: 1996
- Architects: Yevheniya Marynchenko, Petro Zhylytsky, I.Vainer

Website
- Official website

Immovable Monument of National Significance of Ukraine
- Official name: Палац культури "Україна" (Palace of culture "Ukraine")
- Type: Architecture
- Reference no.: 260108

The National Palace of Arts Ukraina (Ukrainian: Національний палац мистецтв «Україна», romanized: Natsionalnyi palats mystetstv «Ukraina») or Palace Ukraina (Палац «Україна») is one of the main theatre venues for official events along with Palace of Sports in Kyiv, Ukraine. The venue is a state company administered by the State Directory of Affairs. The main concert hall has a capacity of 3,714 people.

== History ==
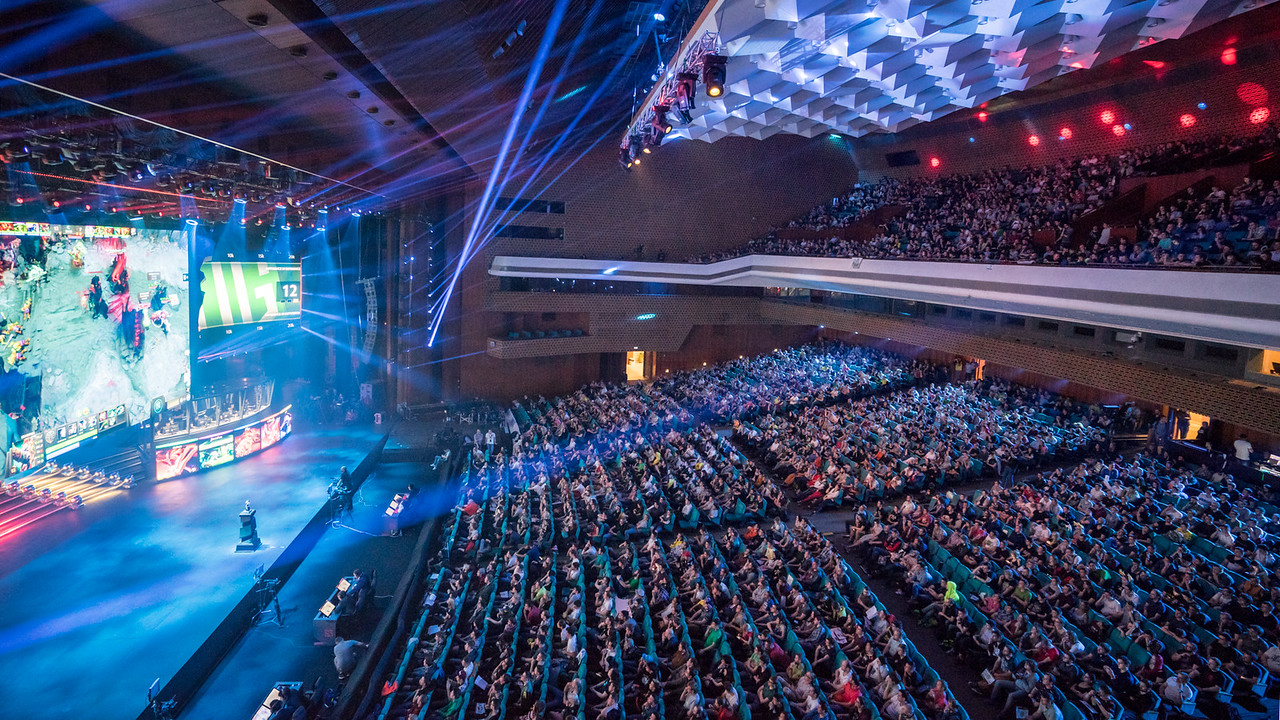
The main hall during the Kiev Major Dota 2 eSports tournament (April 2017)

It was opened in April 1970 as the biggest center of culture and arts. The building was primarily intended to serve as a venue for party congresses and events of the Communist Party of Ukraine, and secondarily as a concert hall. To construct it, Shelest the then party secretary of the Communist Party of Ukraine desguised the construction, in documents sent to Moscow, as only a concert hall. Reason for this was that the Palace had similar dimensions in scale as the Kremlin Palace of Congresses and would most likely not be approved. The building was designed by a group of architects P. Zhylytskyi, I. Vayner, under the directorship of the project's author the distinguished architect of Ukrainian SSR Yevheniya Marynchenko.

All of the architects were awarded Shevchenko National Prize (1971) for its design and construction. The building is trapezoidal, twenty-eight meters tall and consists of over 300 rooms. The exterior of the building, which was remodeled in 1996, is characteristic of the sober and functional Soviet architecture of its time. The interiors and equipment of the lobby as well as artistic rooms of the palace "Ukraine" are designed by the architect I. Karakis.

Although it was finally built on a former market square on Krasnoarmeyskaya street (present vul. Velyka Vasylkivska), it was originally suggested to be built in the place of St. Michael's Golden-Domed Monastery.

On 22 April 1998, the Palace Ukraina received the status of National Palace. Director of the building until 2010 was Mykola Mozhovyy.

On 31 December 2022, during the Russian invasion of Ukraine, the palace was damaged after a Russian rocket fell nearby.

== Major events ==
The first major event was the 42nd Miss Europe 1997 pageant, held on 6 September 1997.

Usually taking place in the Verkhovna Rada building, on 30 November 1999 the venue hosted the presidential inauguration of the newly elected president of Ukraine Leonid Kuchma. Lana Del Rey, Christina Aguilera, Enrique Iglesias, Luciano Pavarotti and Sofia Rotaru are some of the artists that have performed there.

The arena hosted the 11th Junior Eurovision Song Contest 2013, and also hosted the Kiev Major Dota 2 eSports tournament in April 2017.

== Bibliography ==
- Yunakov, Oleg (2016). Architect Joseph Karakis (in Russian). Almaz. ISBN 978-1-68082-000-3.
