= Hotel Ukraine, Chernihiv =

Hotel in Chernihiv, Ukraine

Hotel Ukraine
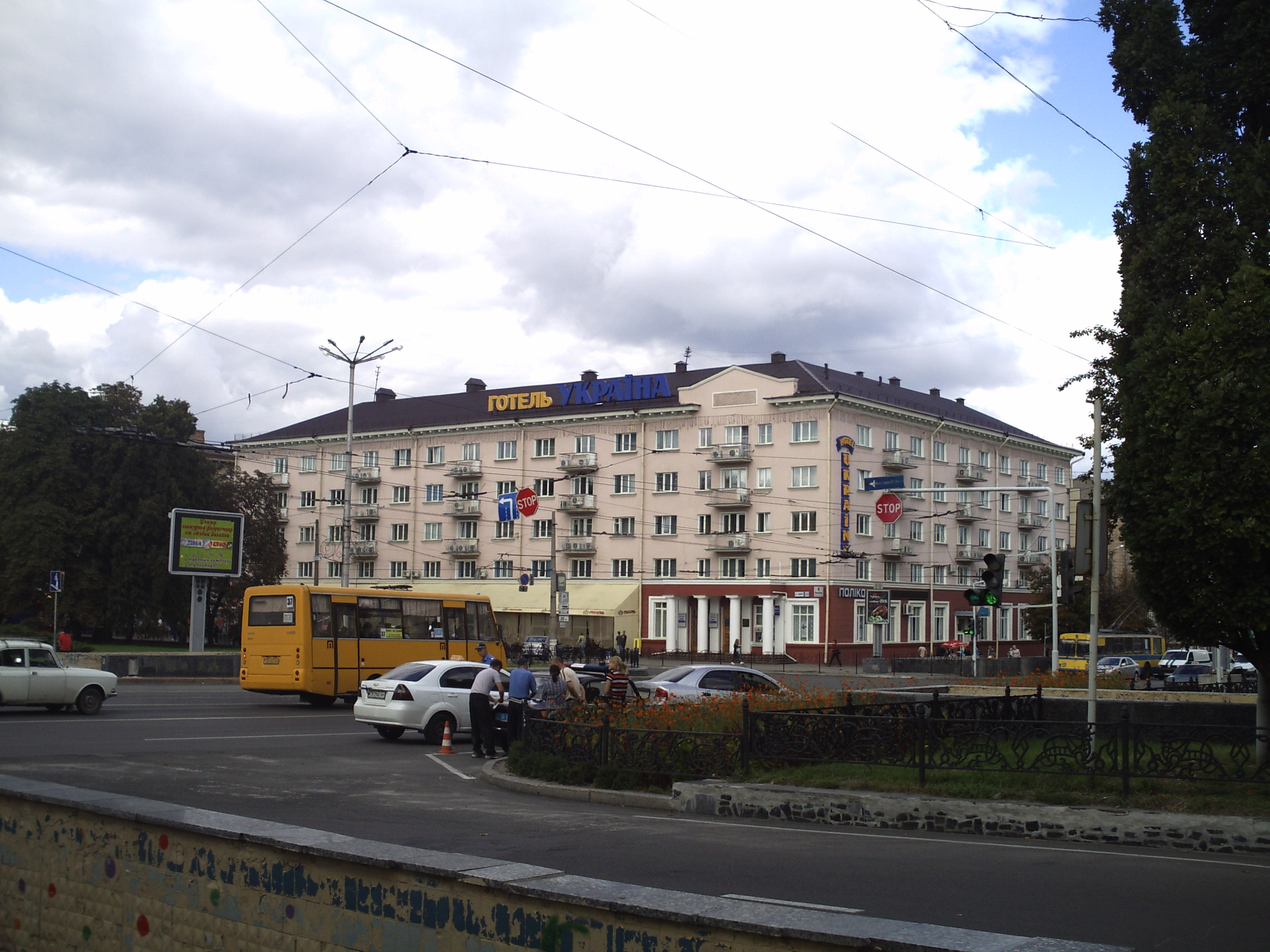

General information
- Location: Chernihiv, Ukraine, 33 Myru Avenue
- Coordinates: 50°29′40″N 31°17′42″E
- Opening: 1961

Other information
- Number of rooms: 93
- Number of suites: 13
- Number of restaurants: 1

Website
- www.ukraine-hotel.kiev.ua

Hotel' Ukrayina (Ukrainian: Готель Україна), also referred to as Hotel Ukraine, was a building located in the center of Chernihiv. Near the hotel were the main post office, shops, banks, ATMs, theatre, hairdresser, coffee shop, pharmacy, central market and more.

It was destroyed in 2022.

== History ==
The hotel first opened in 1961.

On March 12, 2022, in the context of the Russian invasion of Ukraine, a FAB-500 missile shot by the Russian army destroyed the building.

== Description ==
Three-star Hotel Ukraine was located in the center of Chernihiv, 200 meters from the central Krasna Square. The hotel had 93 rooms of different categories. Each room was equipped with cable TV, air conditioning, a mini safe and a refrigerator

== See also ==
- List of hotels in Chernihiv

== Gallery ==
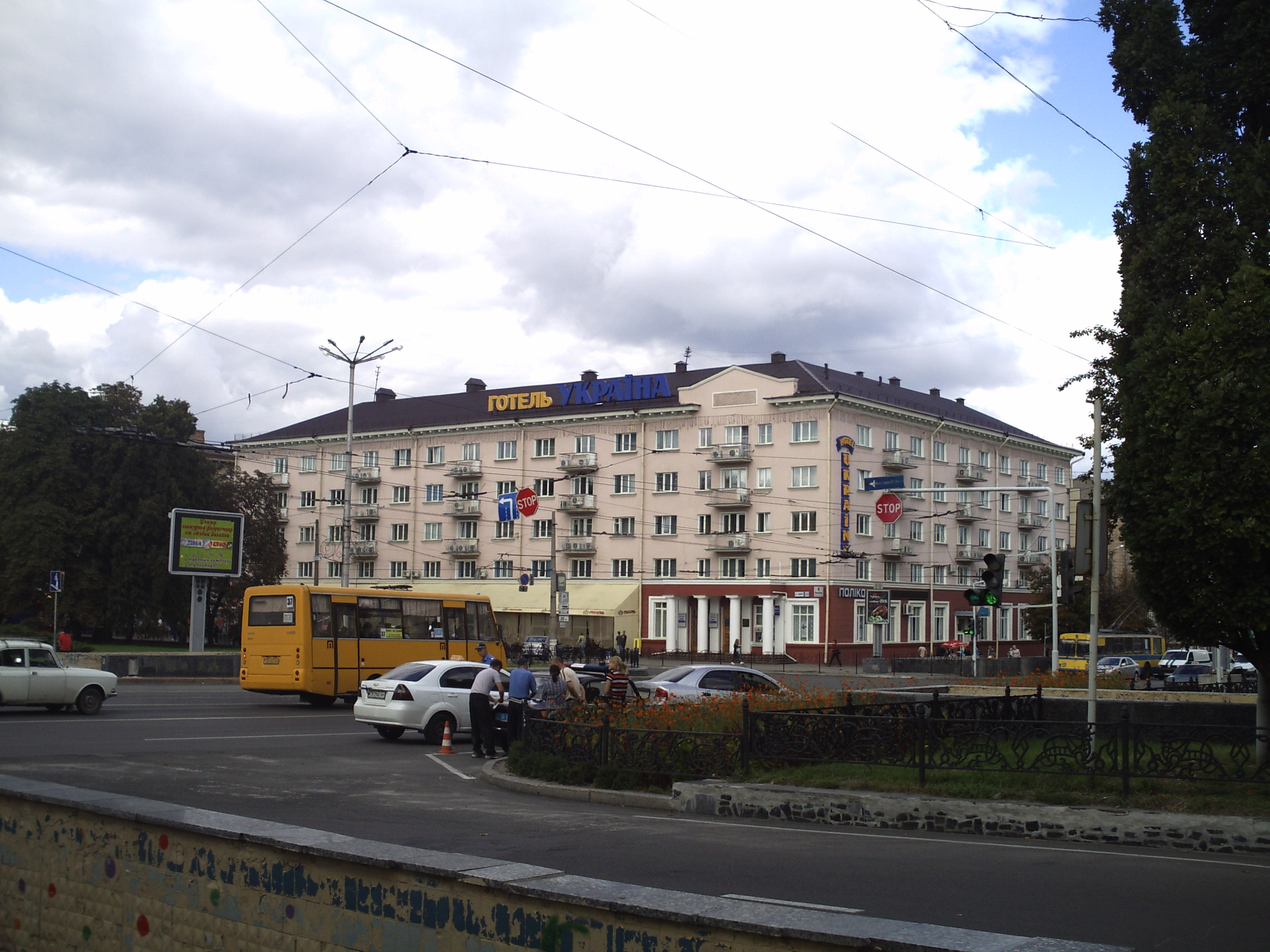
