= Yevheniya Marynchenko =

Ukrainian architect

- Маринченко Євгенія Олександрівна
- Born: 28 February 1916; Petrograd, Russian Empire
- Died: 15 June 1999 (aged 83); Kyiv, Ukraine
- Education: Kyiv National University of Construction and Architecture
- Occupation: Architect
- Notable work: Palace "Ukraine" (co-architect), Pushcha-Ozerna Sanatorium
- Style: Stalinist architecture, Modernism
- Father: Oleksandr Marynchenko
- Awards: Shevchenko National Prize, Order of the Badge of Honour, Order of the Red Banner of Labour
- Honours: People's architect of Ukraine, Honoured architect of Ukrainian SSR

Yevheniya Marynchenko (Ukrainian: Мари́нченко Євге́нія Олекса́ндрівна; 18 December 1916 – 15 June 1999) was a Ukrainian architect. She was a recipient of the 1971 Shevchenko Prize for authoring the project of Palace "Ukraine".

== Early life and education ==
Marynchenko was born in 1916 into a family of architects. Her maternal grandfather Yevheniy Tolstoy was an architect and an engineer who worked as a chief of Mariinskyi Palace.

Marynchenko's parents graduated from the department of architecture of Kyiv Art School. Her father, Oleksandr, continued his studies at the Kyiv Art Institute, becoming a well-known architect, teacher, author of books on architecture in Kyiv, and obtained the degree of candidate of sciences in architecture.

I received an architectural upbringing in my family, which is just as necessary for a person as artistic and musical, because our whole life is constantly surrounded by architecture, which we need to learn to see. Already at an early age, I learned to understand architecture as a high art, to feel the beauty of proportions, forms and volumes. Along with love for nature, love for the art of architecture lives in my soul all my life.

— Yevheniya Marynchenko, Archive of E. O. Marynchenko, volume 1 // National Reserve "Sofia Kyivska".

At school she preferred drawing lessons and served as an artist in the editorial board of the school newspaper. At home, she often painted with watercolours. She was especially fond of plein air painting.

In 1931, she finished the seven-year school and entered the architectural faculty of the construction technical school.

== Career ==
From 1934, she worked in the construction industry, proving herself as a capable and responsible manager, working as an architect's assistant in one of the architectural design workshops.

In 1935–1941, she studied at the Kyiv Engineering and Construction Institute under the famous architects Oleksandr Verbytskyi and Petro Yurchenko. During this time, she defends her thesis on the topic "Palace of Culture of the Arsenal Factory in Kyiv".

From 1943, she worked in Kyiv on the restoration and reconstruction of buildings destroyed by the war: buildings of Kyiv University, the Mariinskyi Palace, the former bank building on Khreshchatyk, the KPI assembly hall, and since 1945 at the project institute "Diprocivilprombud".

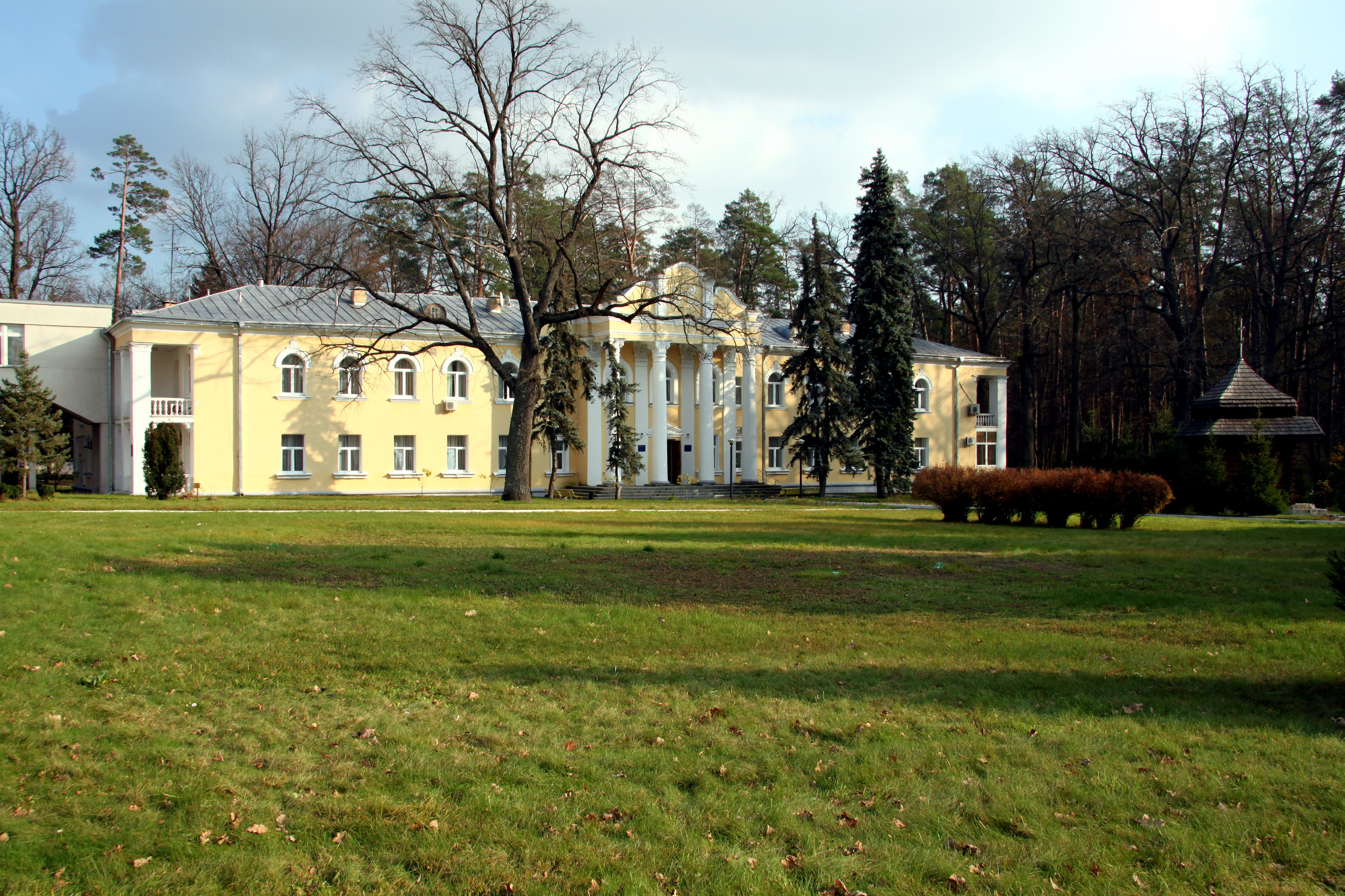
Sanatorium's water treatment building (1948–1949)

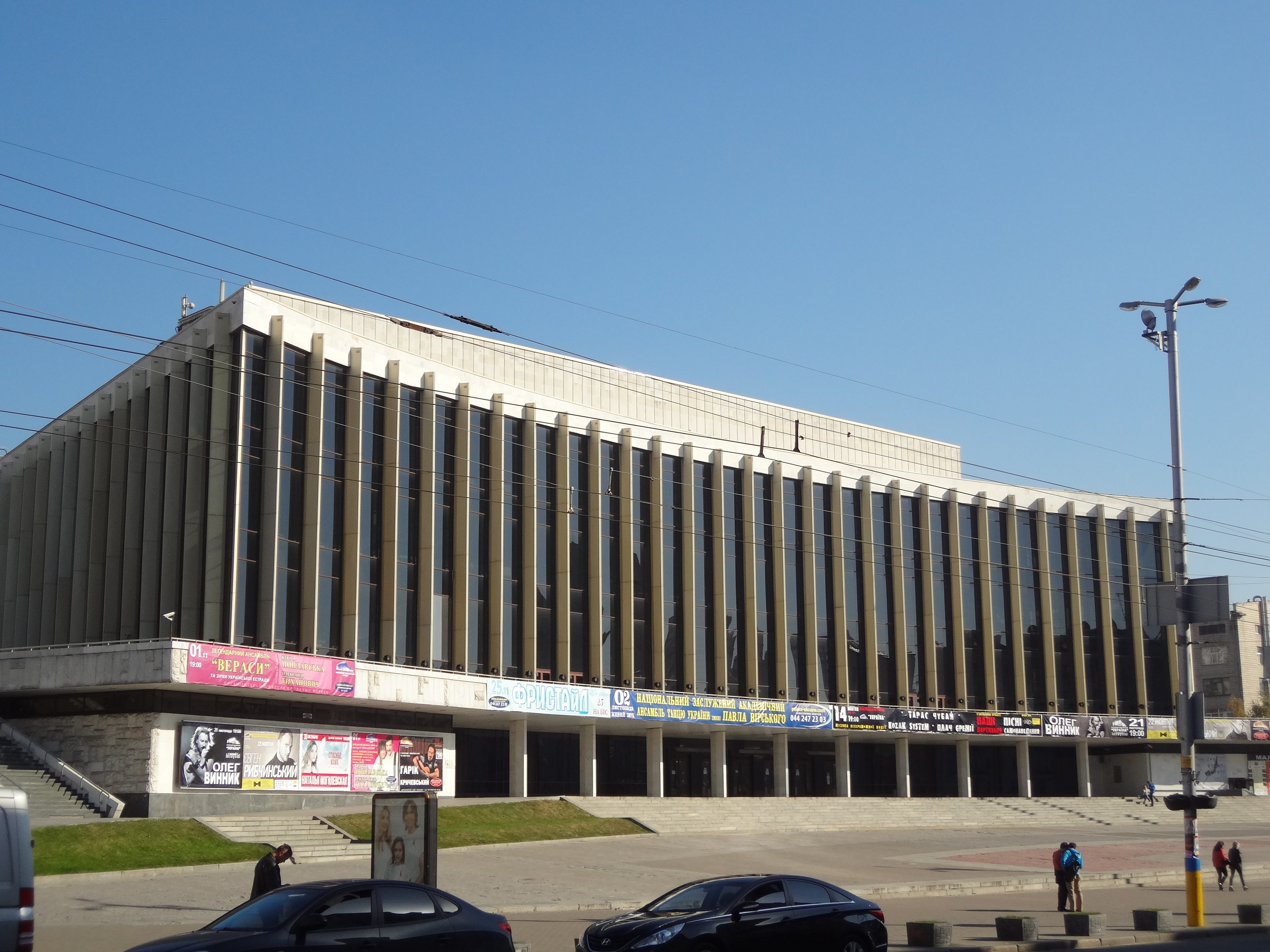
Palace "Ukraine"

The first notable and significant embodiment of Yevgenia's work was the project of a water treatment sanatorium complex in Pushcha-Vodytsia, which at that time was located outside Kyiv city limits. The general plan of the medical complex was developed in 1946. Further design and construction was carried out for almost 20 years.

For designing and participating in the construction of the "30 years of Soviet Ukraine" sanatorium, Yevhenia Marynchenko was awarded a prize and an honorary certificate at the republican competition for the best built objects of civil engineering in 1949.

The original core of the sanatorium, which in the 1990s was renamed "Pushcha-Ozerna", is a recognised architectural monument of the first post-war decade of the 20th century.

Simultaneously with the work on the sanatorium complex, she created more than 70 construction projects serving various purposes, over 30 of these projects were implemented, including:

- Residential houses in Kyiv on Nagirnia, Zolotoustivska, Bastionnia, Mykhailo Boychuk streets, Povitroflotskyy avenue;
- New quarters in Odesa, Kherson and Kharkiv;
- Novobilychi housing estate in Kyiv;
- Workers village of the South-Ukrainian Canal near the village of Novokyiivka;

Since the beginning of the 1960s, she worked in a creative team on her most notable project — construction of the Palace "Ukraine".

In 1971, Marinchenko, along with her team was awarded the Taras Shevchenko State Prize of the Ukrainian SSR and honorary title of "Honoured Architect of the Ukrainian SSR" for the construction of the Palace "Ukraine". In 1990s, the building received protective status of an architectural monument.

In February–March 1973, she was dispatched to Iraq with a group of specialists, where she made project sketches for the creation of the Palace of Culture in Baghdad.

In 1975, under her authorship, the first edition of the book "Palace of Culture "Ukraine" in Kyiv" was published in Ukrainian, Russian and English. The second edition was published in 1979.

From 1980 until her death, she lived in Kyiv at the address: Mala Zhytomyrska str., 10. At the end of her life, she actively collaborated with the Ukrainian Society for the Protection of Historical and Cultural Monuments. She died on 15 June 1999.

== Sources ==
- Ukrainian Soviet Encyclopedia: in 12 volumes / ch. ed. M. P. Bazhan; editor: O. K. Antonov and others. — 2nd edition. — K.: Main editorial office of USE, 1974–1985.
- Yevhenia Marynchenko on the official website of the Taras Shevchenko National Award Committee of Ukraine
- Shakula S. Architect Evhenia Oleksandrivna Marynchenko (1916-1999) and the fate of the Mykhailivskyi Golden-Top Cathedral https://www.myslenedrevo.com.ua/
- A tireless servant of architecture. To the 100th anniversary of the birth of Ye. Marynchenko (1916—1999) Archived copy 2016, the first half of the year: calendar of notable days. No. 1 (7) / National Parliamentary Library of Ukraine. — K., 2016. — pp. 69–72.
