= President Hotel (Kyiv) =

Hotel in Kyiv, Ukraine

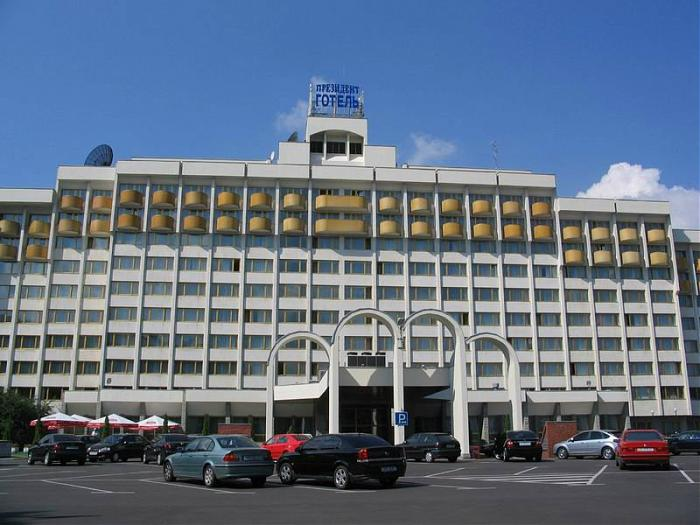
- Interactive map of the President Hotel area
- Hotel chain: Vertex Hotel Group

General information
- Location: Ukraine, vul. Hospitalna 12; Kyiv, Ukraine
- Coordinates: 50.435915°N 30.526092°E
- Opening: 1990
- Owner: Government of Ukraine
- Management: State Management of Affairs (Ukraine)

Other information
- Number of rooms: 374

Website
- http://presidenthotel.com.ua

The President Hotel (Ukrainian: Президент-Готель, Prezydent-Hotel) is a hotel in the center of Pechersk, Kyiv, Ukraine. It was initially built as part of the All-Union hotel chain Intourist. Today, the hotel belongs to hotel chain Vertex Hotel Group.

== Restaurant ==
The hotel has its own restaurant, à la carte "Slavyansky", that serves Ukrainian and Mediterranean cuisine.

== Construction history and operation ==
"President Hotel was built in 1990 and became the last project of the all-Union Intourist and was part of the hotel complex.

The design of the hotel's façade — a vault of four arches — is inspired by the legend of the times of Kievan Rus, when four arches served as the entrance to the city — gates that were considered a symbol of hospitality.

Since 1998, President Hotel has been an independent four-star hotel complex with extensive infrastructure.

In 2012, President Hotel underwent a large-scale reconstruction. The hotel's room stock was completely renovated in accordance with the standards for 4-star hotels. Banqueting and conference halls were reconstructed, allowing up to 17 independent events to be held simultaneously.

== See also ==
- List of hotels in Ukraine
