= Hotel Hradecky =

Hotel in Chernihiv

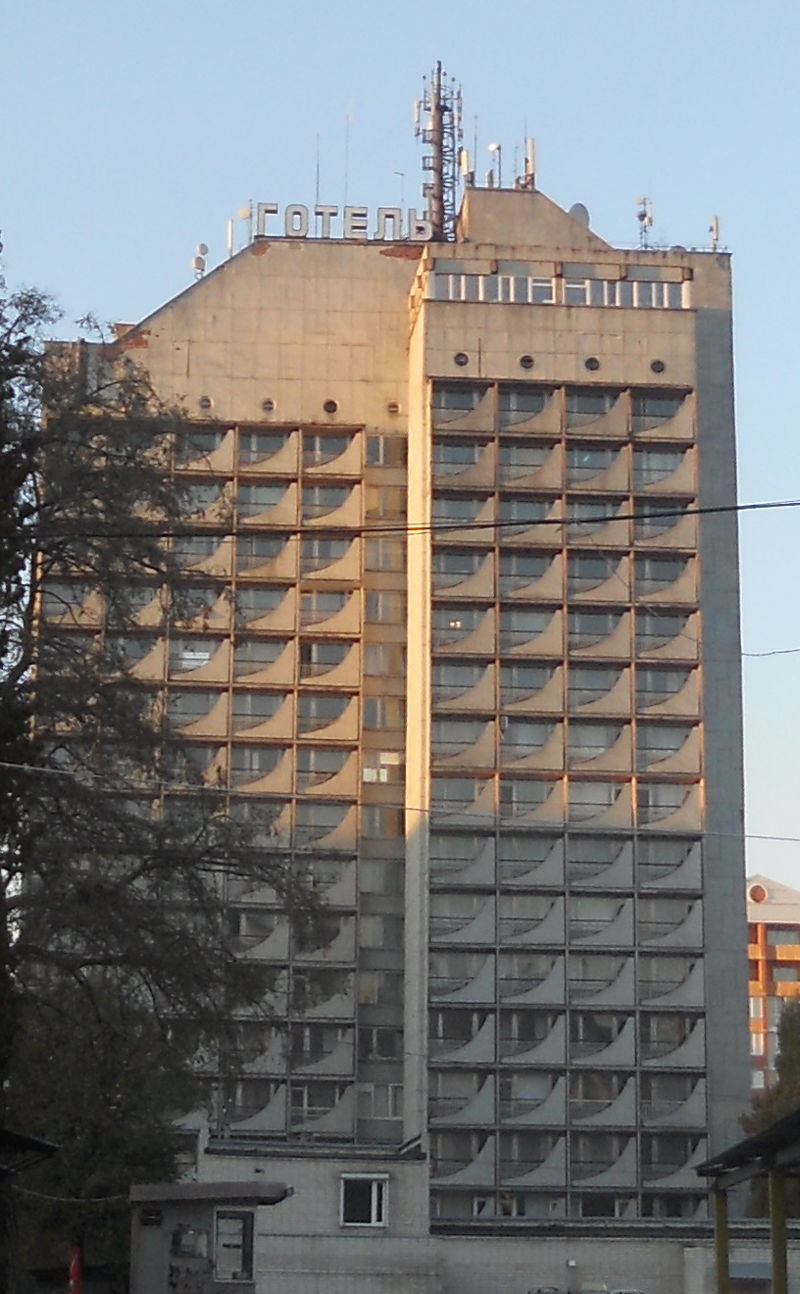

General information
- Location: Chernihiv, Chernihiv Oblast, Ukraine, Novozavods'kyi district
- Opening: 1980
- Owner: Oksana Golubova

Technical details
- Floor count: 18

Other information
- Number of rooms: 267
- Number of restaurants: 1

Hradetsky Hotel (Ukrainian: Готель Градецький), is a 21-storey hotel in Chernihiv. It is one of the tallest buildings in the city.

== Description ==
The largest hotel in the city, located in a high-rise building, a 10-minute walk from the center, close to the main attractions of the city: Catherine's Church, Pyatnytska Church, Transfiguration Cathedral, Krasna Square, Shchors cinema, and Dytynets Park. It is also located 4 km from the Chernihiv–Ovruch railway and 140 km from Boryspil International Airport and Kyiv International Airport (Zhuliany) in Kyiv. The Gradetsky restaurant is considered one of the best in the city. The hotel offers suites, one-bed, and two-bed rooms.

== History ==
The 22-storey building was built in 1980 and opened in 1981. KyivZDNIEP design organization.

Architects Valentyn Shtolko, Alla Grachova, Oleksandr Kabatsky, Volodymyr Ralchenko, design engineer Volodymyr Sloboda, and builder Ihor Lyubenko took an active part in the design and construction of the hotel. In 1984, they were awarded the Shevchenko Prize. Interiors and furniture were designed by architect IJ Karakis. In 1997, the hotel was partially renovated.

An advertisement for the sale of a hotel and office complex in the central part of Chernihiv worth UAH 25,000,000 appeared on the popular OLX sales site.24_big-570x3901-e1493131068125.

In 2018, the Gradetsky Hotel has new owners, including Oksana Golubova, head of the Chernihiv branch of the Solidarity V. Nalyvaichenko party, and Yuriy Tarasovets, a former city council deputy, banker and developer. of the current convocation of the city council, they want to restore the hotel and preserve its profile, "said Alexander Gaspar. It will be recalled that the initial value of the building put up for sale for debts by the seller - the State Executive Service - is over UAH 17 million, but two auctions could not determine the winner of the auction.

In 2020 "33by Architecture" has published the project of the SIVER residential complex, which is proposed to be built instead of the Hradetsky Hotel in Chernihiv. Designers showed Atroshenko's house in the center of Chernihiv. According to the project, it is proposed to build 4 residential buildings, a closed courtyard and parking. Three houses on 25 floors and one on 10-11 floors. As you know, 33by Architecture has designed a business center on Kyivska Street in Chernihiv and the house of Mayor Vladyslav Atroshenko, opposite Bohdan Khmelnytsky Park.

== Services ==
=== Main Services ===
- suites
- single and double rooms
- bathroom
- shower
- TV
- refrigerator

=== Additional services ===
- pharmacy kiosk
- pets allowed
- taxi call
- cable TV
- ticket office (air, railway),
- conference hall (seats 30)
- photocopier
- shops
- currency exchange
- disabled facilities
- national TV
- paid guarded parking
- beauty salon
- dental office
- fax
- dry cleaning
- Billiards
- bowling
- casino
- night club
- Restaurant "Gradetsky" (seats 250)

== See also ==
- List of hotels in Chernihiv

== Gallery ==
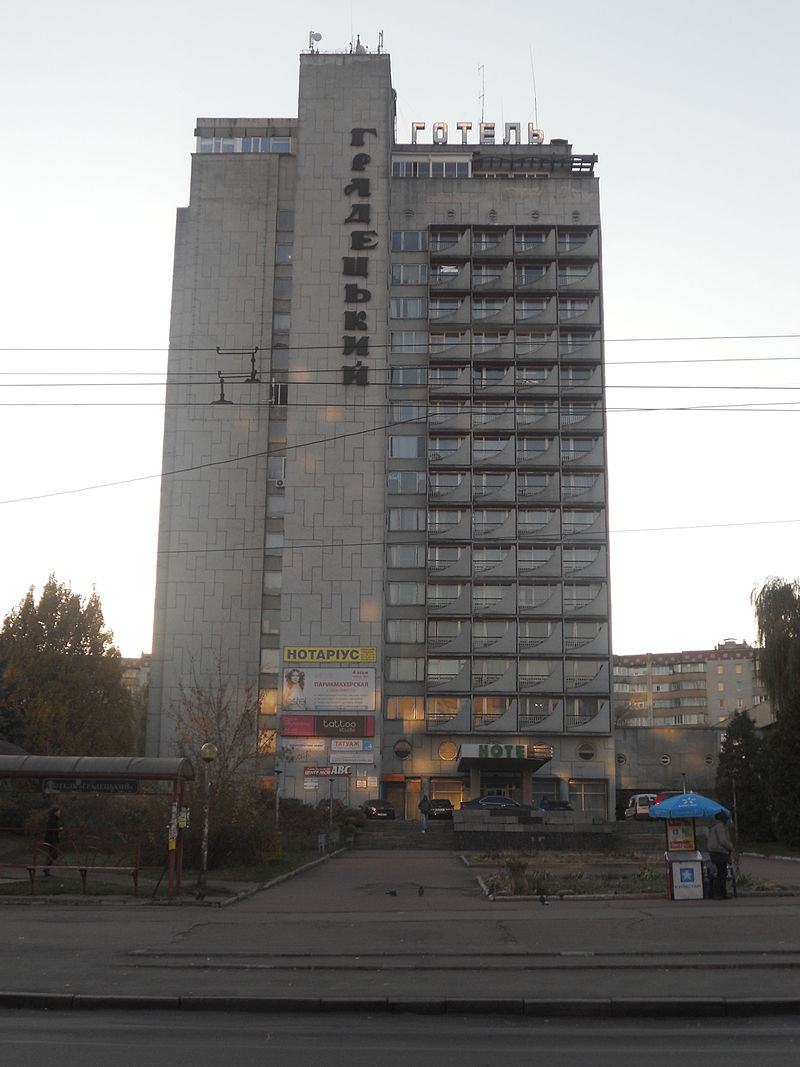

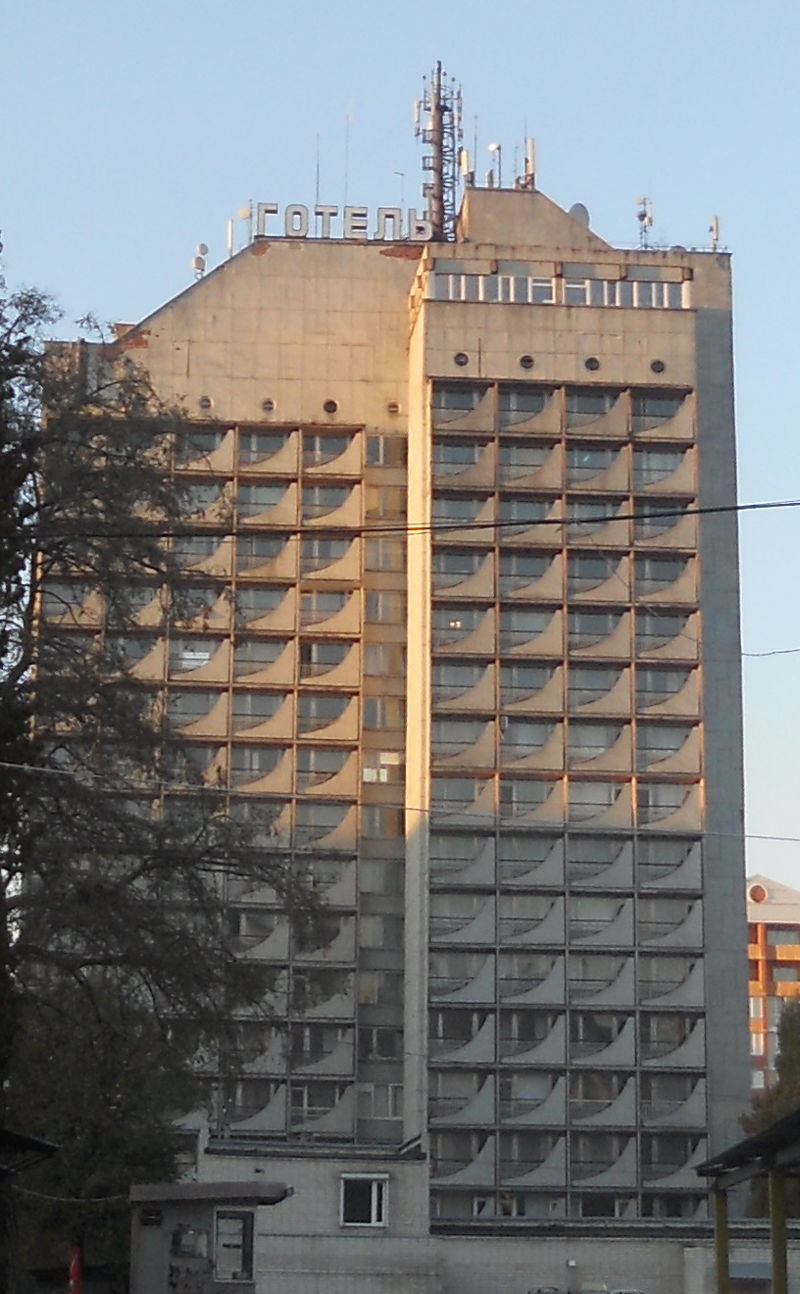
