= InterContinental Kyiv =

Hotel in Kyiv, Ukraine

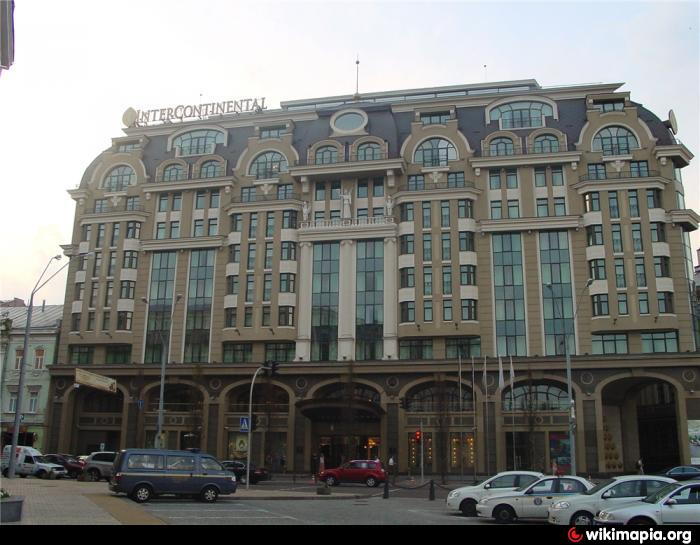
- Interactive map of the InterContinental Kyiv area
- Hotel chain: InterContinental

General information
- Location: Kyiv, Ukraine, 2A vulytsia Velyka Zhytomyrska; Kyiv, Ukraine
- Coordinates: 50.455639°N 30.519278°E
- Operator: InterContinental Hotels Group

Technical details
- Floor count: 13 (2 underground)

Other information
- Number of rooms: 272
- Number of suites: 8
- Number of restaurants: 3
- Parking: 55 (controlled access)

Website
- kyiv.intercontinental.com

The InterContinental Kyiv is a five-star hotel in the center of Kyiv, Ukraine (Old Kyiv neighborhood). The 11-story hotel has 272 hotel rooms, and is operated by the InterContinental Hotels Group. The hotel is next to the Mykhailivs'ka ploshcha (Saint Michael's Square). There is an underground garage with a controlled access.

== Awards ==
=== IHG Hotel Star Awards 2015 ===
- InterContinental Hotel of the Year 2015
- HeartBeat Excellence Award 2015
- Developing People Award 2015

=== IHG Celebrate Cervice 2015 ===
- Winner EMEA Video Award 2015

=== Ukrainian Hospitality Awards 2014 ===
- Best 5* Business Hotel 2014

=== IHG Hotel Star Awards 2014 ===
- CEO Special Award 2014
- Great Hotels Guests Love Award 2014

=== Ukrainian Hospitality Awards 2013 ===
- Best Business Hotel 2013
- Best SCR Program 2013

=== Ukrainian Hospitality Awards 2012 ===
- Business Hotel of the Year 2012

=== Ukrainian Hospitality Awards 2011 ===
- Business Hotel of the Year 2011

=== Luxury Lifestyle Awards 2010 ===
- Luxury Lifestyle Best Hotel 2010

== Amenities ==
Amenities include a fitness center, an indoor lap pool, jacuzzi, full service spa, a business center, and permit pets some rooms. The conference center contains Grand Ballroom and 5 meeting rooms.

== See also ==
- List of hotels in Ukraine § Kyiv
- List of tallest buildings in Kyiv
