= Nataliia Chmutina =

- Наталія Чмутіна
- Born: December 18, 1912; Kyiv, Russian Empire
- Died: November 8, 2005 (aged 92); Kyiv, Ukraine
- Occupation: Architect
- Notable work: Verkhovna Rada building, Hotel Dnipro, House of Furniture

Signature
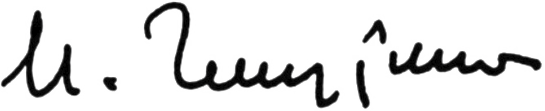

Nataliia Chmutina (Ukrainian: Наталія Чмутіна; 18 December 1912 – 8 November 2005) was a Ukrainian architect and academician. Member of the National Union of Architects of Ukraine and Honorary Member of the Ukrainian Academy of Architecture.

== Biography ==
She was born in 1912 in Kyiv. From 1918 to 1926 she lived with her grandmother in Aramil (now Sverdlovsk Oblast, Russia). She received a secondary education there. Later she studied at foreign language courses. At the same time she graduated from drawing courses.

In 1930-1936 she studied at the Faculty of Architecture of the Kyiv Civil Engineering Institute in the studio of architect Volodymyr Zabolotny. In 1936, as a part of Zabolotny's team, she took part in a competition for the project of the Session Hall of the Verkhovna Rada building in Kyiv. Their project eventually won.

From 1938 to 1941, she worked as an architect of the Capital Construction Department of the Aircraft Repair Plant № 43 in Kyiv.

In 1941-44, during the evacuation, she worked as an architect in the Aramil, Ivanovo and Moscow. Shortly after the liberation of Kyiv, she returned to the city.

From 1946 to 1999, she taught at the National Academy of Visual Arts and Architecture. In 1952 she becomes first woman to receive Candidate of Architecture degree in the USSR.

She was fluent in German and French and in 1965 spoke in Paris at the VIII Congress of the International Union of Architects.

In 1971, she worked with architect A. Stukalov & Y. Chekanyuk in "The House of furniture". The project was conceived by its author, N. Chmutina, with a dual performance: trade and exhibition. In the project, there is a trading floors and also the project mirroring the interiors of real apartments with examples of furniture compositions.

She died in 2005, at the age of 92. In 2012, commemorating 100th anniversary of her birth, at the house on the 22 Volodymyrska street in Kyiv, where the architect lived, on November 29, 2012, a memorial plaque was installed.

== Notable works ==
- Restaurant "Riviera" in Kyiv (1936-1937)
- The building of the Verkhovna Rada of Ukrainian SSR on the Hrushevsky Street in Kyiv (1936-1939)
- Cotton factory in Armavir (in evacuation, 1942)
- Restoration of the destroyed building of the Verkhovna Rada
- Intourist Hotel in Kyiv (1952-1956)
- The building of the Union of Consumer Societies ("Ukoopspilka") in Kyiv (1957-1964)
- Hotel Dnipro on European square in Kyiv (1959-1964)
- Hotel "Tarasova Gora" in Kaniv (1962)
- Department furniture store "House of Furniture" in Kyiv (1963-1967)
- Hotel "Lybid" on Victory Square in Kyiv (1965-1970)
Verkhovna Rada

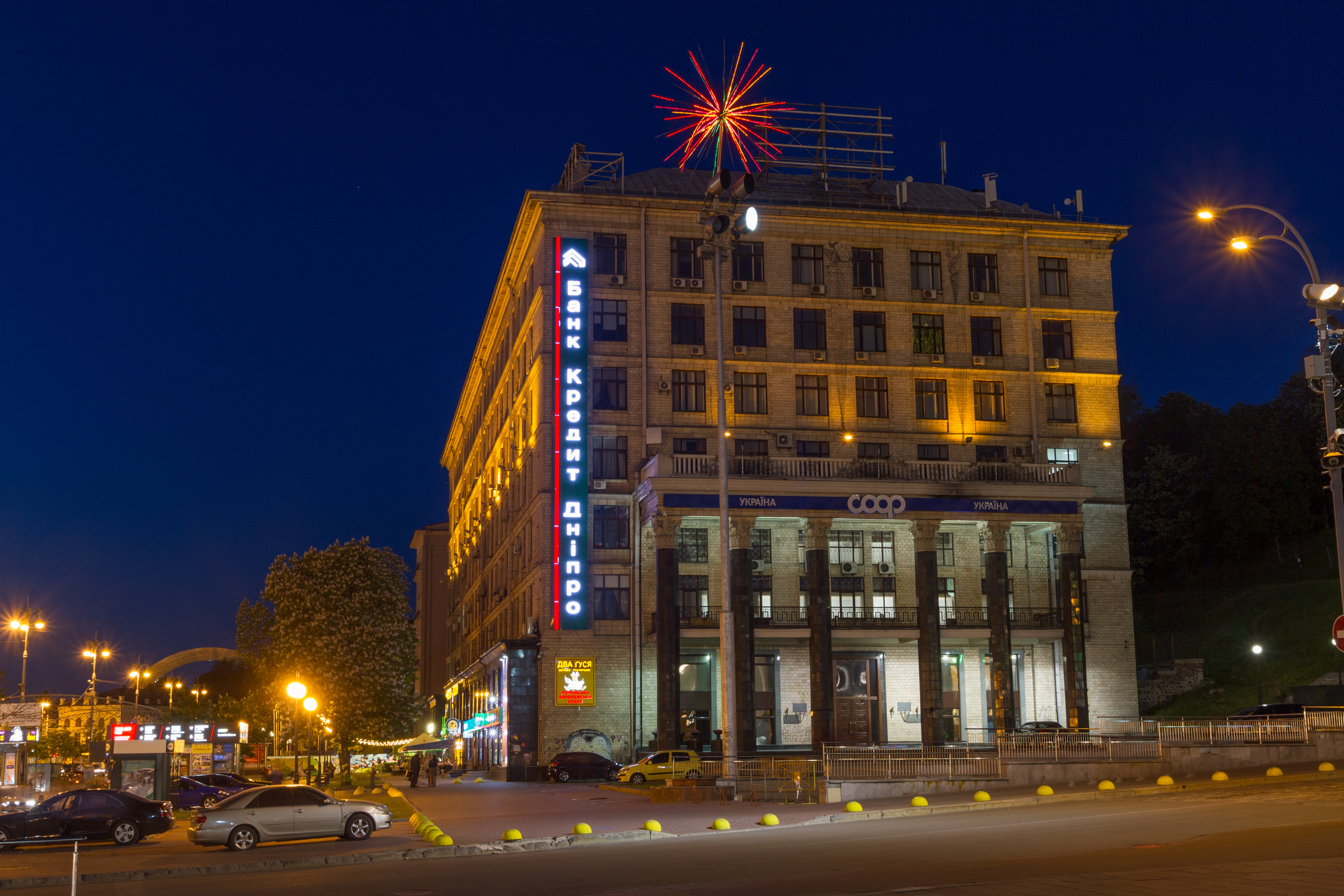
Ukoopspilka

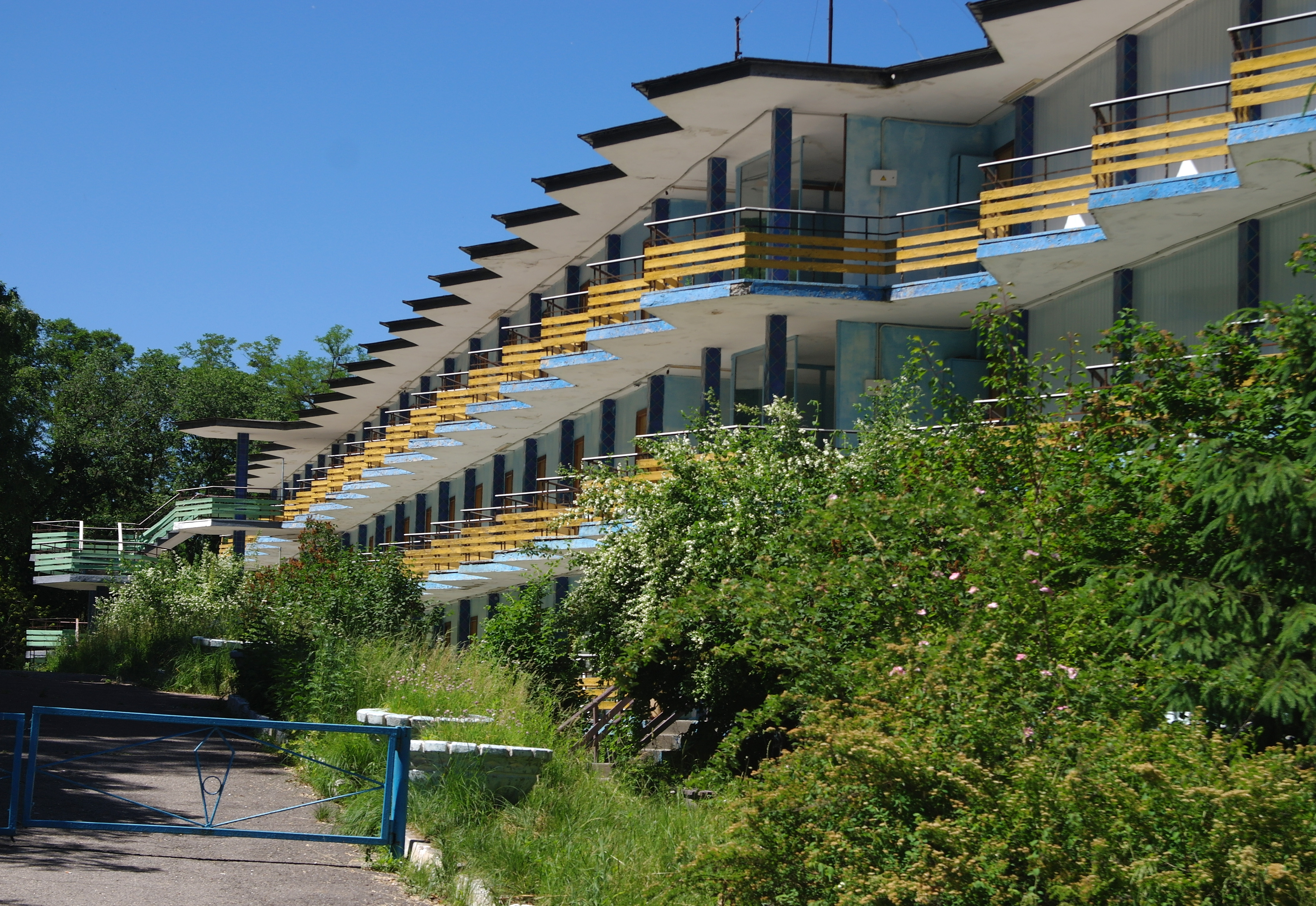
Hotel Tarasova Gora

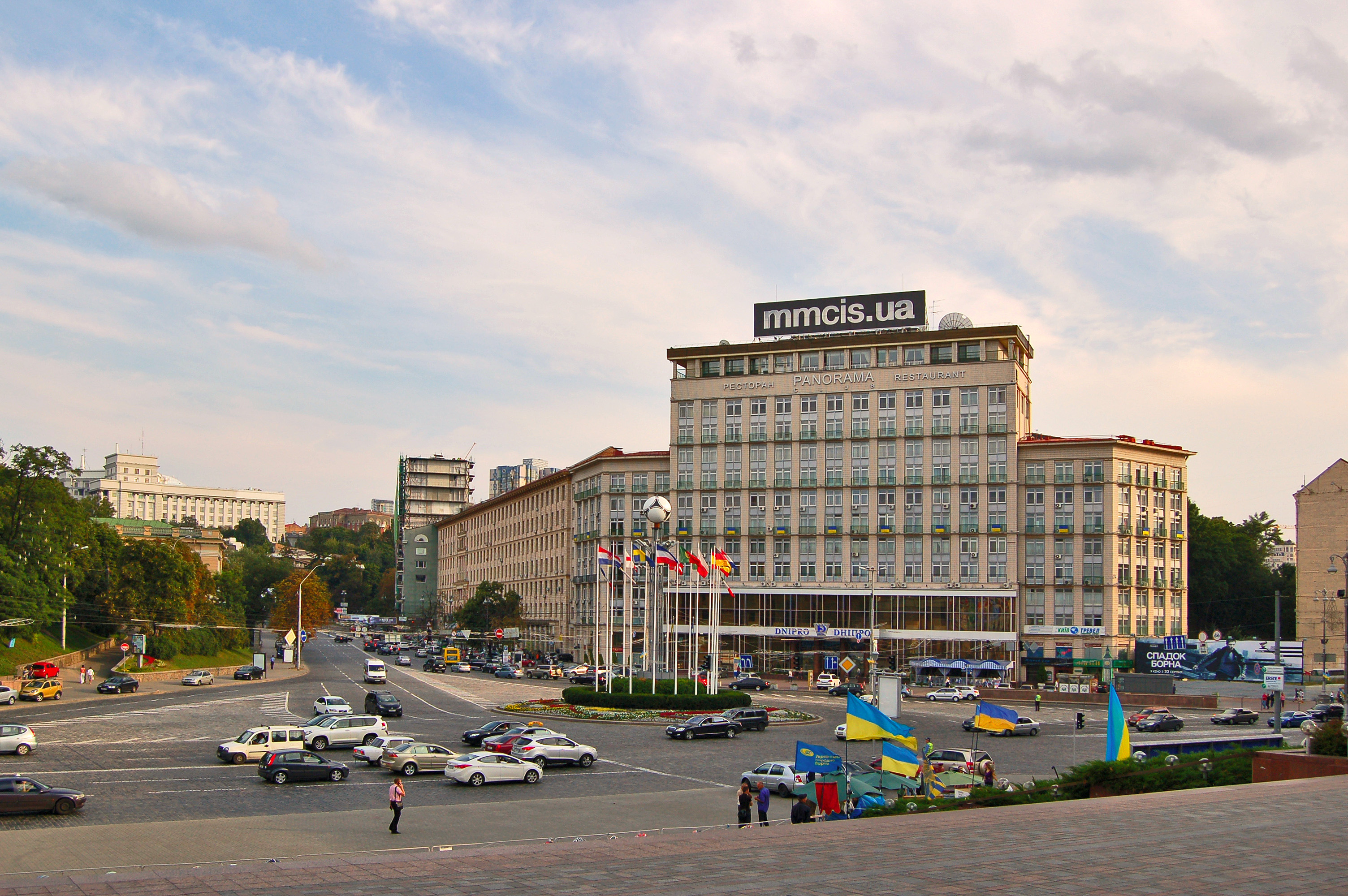
Hotel Dnipro

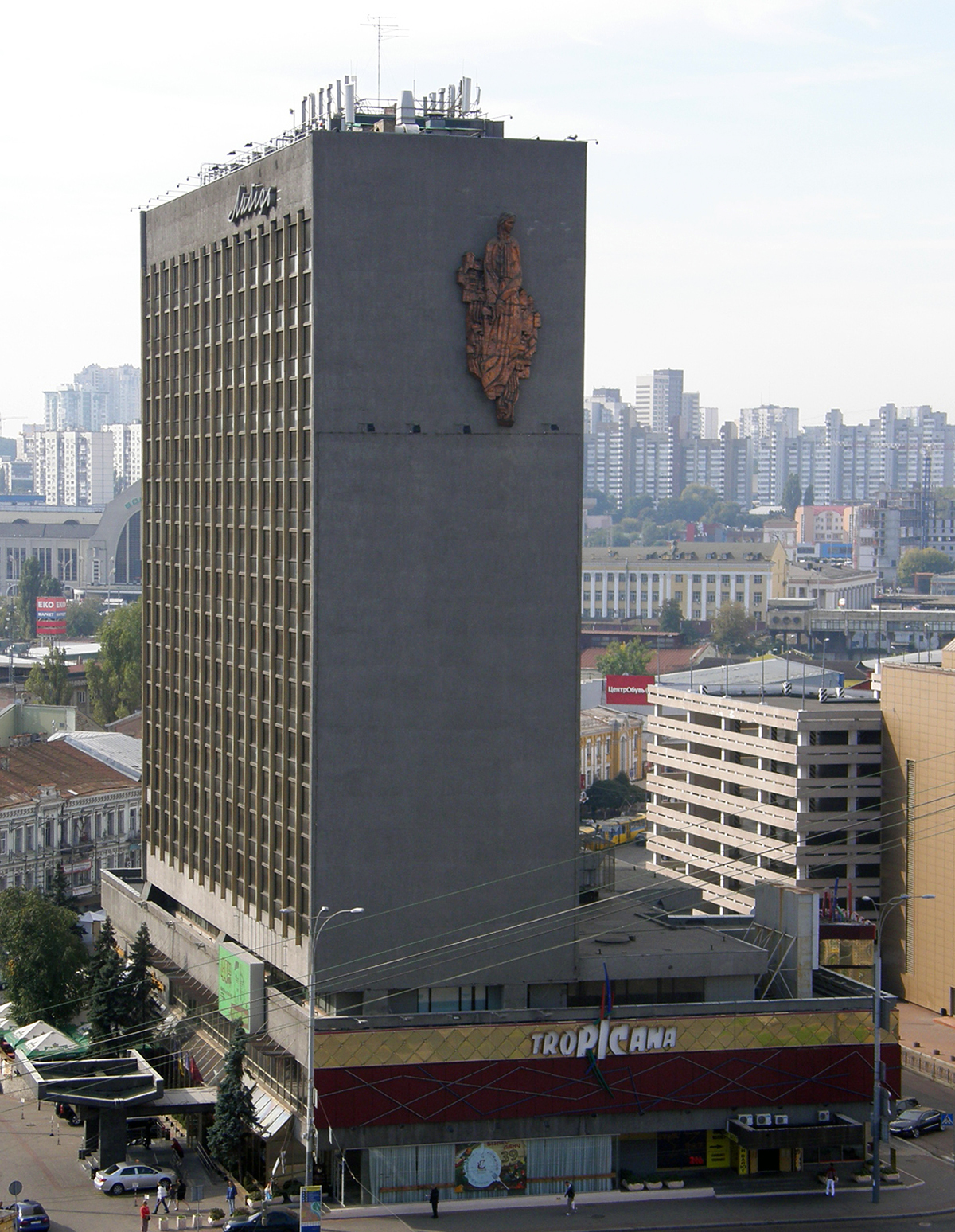
Hotel Lybid

== See also ==
- Zarema Nagayeva

== Sources ==
- Natalia Borysivna Chmutina: Life and creative path of an architect / edited. O. V. Maznichenko. - К.: АДЕФ-Україна, 2012. - 300 с. : 285 il. - ISBN 978-966-187-185-3
- Chmutina Natalia // Encyclopedia of Ukrainian Studies: Dictionary part: [in 11 volumes] / Shevchenko Scientific Society; Goal. ed. Prof., Dr. Vladimir Kubiyovych. - Paris — New York: Young Life, 1955-1995.
- Chmutina Natalia Borysivna // Art of Ukraine: Biographical reference book / edited by: AV Kudrytsky, MG Labinsky; for order. AV Kudrytsky. - Kyiv: "Ukrainian Encyclopedia", 1997. - 700 p. - ISBN 5-88500-071-9
- Formation of Natalia Chmutina's school in the context of architectural culture of Ukraine of the Soviet era: author's ref. dis. ... Cand. art history: 26.00.01 / OV Maznichenko; Nat. acad. of Arts of Ukraine, Inst. of Modern Problems. art. - K., 2015. - 16 p.
