= Hotel Dnipro =

Hotel in Kyiv, Ukraine

Coordinates: 50.4516°N 30.5275°E

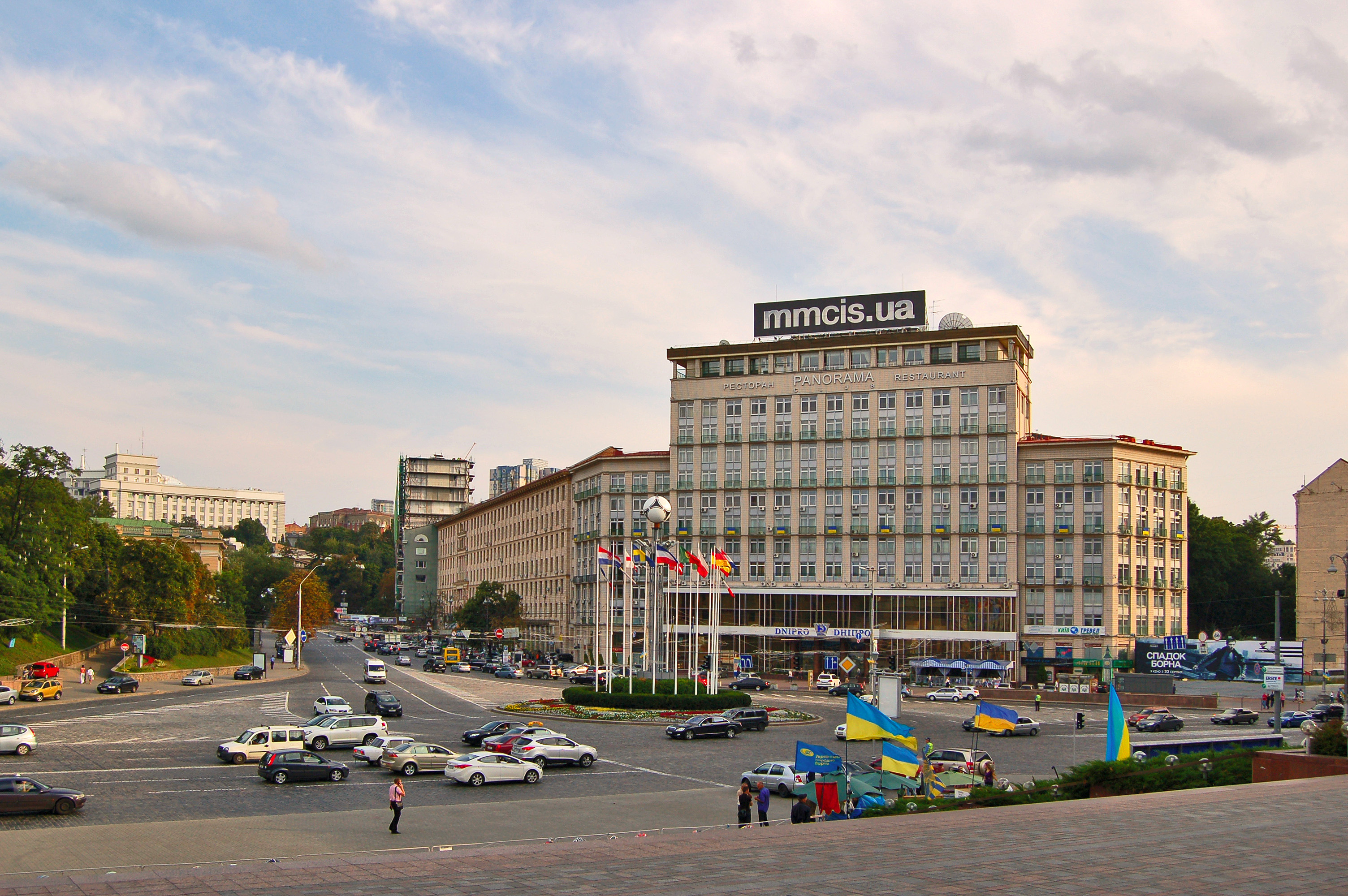
- Interactive map of the Hotel Dnipro area

General information
- Location: Ukraine, 1/2 Khreshchatyk; Kyiv, Ukraine
- Opening: 1964
- Owner: Smartland

Technical details
- Floor count: 12

Design and construction
- Architects: Viktor Yelizarov, Nataliia Chmutina

Other information
- Number of rooms: 186
- Parking: 56 parking spaces

Website
- www.dniprohotel.ua

Hotel Dnipro (Ukrainian: Готель Дніпро) is a four-star hotel located in central Kyiv, the capital of Ukraine, on European Square, next to Khreschatyk Street and near Maidan Nezalezhnosti (Independence Square).

The hotel was built in 1964 in a location which originally was occupied by Kyiv's Hotel Yevropa. The interior and design of the restaurant in the Hotel Dnipro was made by the architect Irma Karakis.

Formally state owned, in July 2020 the hotel was sold to the private real estate company Smartland. Smartland won an open auction with their bid of ₴1,111,111,222.22 (about US$40 million (at the time)).

== Location ==
The four-star Dnipro Hotel is located in the center of Kyiv on European Square. It is situated next to Khreschatyk Street and near Maidan Nezalezhnosti (Independence Square).

The area where the modern building sits is significant to the history of Kyiv and its geography. Being located close to the Dnieper and facing it directly, the view out of the hotel rooms is appreciable, overlooking the river and the Kyiv Hills covered in parks, churches and museums.

== See also ==
- List of hotels in Ukraine#Kyiv
