= Pavlo Alyoshin =

Ukrainian Soviet architect (1881–1961)

Pavlo Fedotovich Alyoshin
- Павло Федотович Альошин
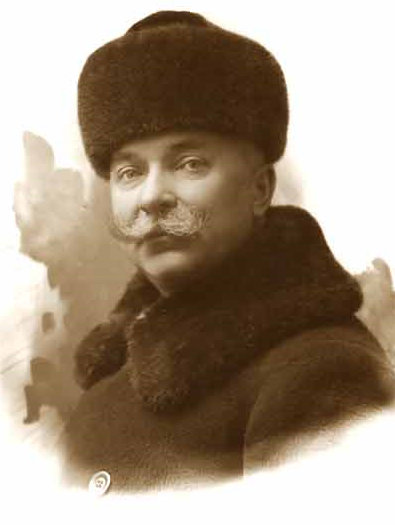
- A portrait of Alyoshin.
- Born: 16 April 1881; Kyiv, Kiev Governorate, Russian Empire
- Died: 7 October 1961 (aged 80); Kyiv, Ukrainian SSR, Soviet Union
- Resting place: Lychakiv Cemetery; 49.833°N 24.056°E
- Education: Kyiv Drawing School; Institute of Civil Engineers in St. Petersburg; Imperial Academy of Arts
- Occupation: Architect
- Years active: 1906-1952
- Buildings: Pedagogical Museum
- Projects: Mariinskyi Palace; Red University Building

Pavlo Alyoshin (16 February 1881 – 7 October 1961) was a Ukrainian Soviet architect and civil engineer. Throughout his career, he employed a wide variety of architectural styles, and helped to create the Pedagogical Museum, the incomplete city of "New Kharkiv", and the Kovalevsky mansion also known as the "Palace of Sighs".

Born in Kyiv into a family of craftsmen, he first attended the Kyiv Drawing School before going to St. Petersburg to study at the Institute of Civil Engineers. There, as the best student in his class, he was allowed to study abroad and learn Western architecture. In 1904 he graduated from the school, and by 1906 was allowed to complete his first individual project which was a women's gymnasium. In 1909 he was given the task of designing the Pedagogical Museum, perhaps his most famous creation, which was completed in 1911 in an Empire style. In the late 1910s, he worked on a mansion for the Kovalevsky family and started experimenting in a Ukrainian national style and neo-baroque. In 1917 he graduated from the Imperial Academy of Arts, and then from the 1920s to 1930s worked as a chief architect of Murmansk, then Kyiv, and helped create the incomplete sotsgorod city of "New Kharkiv". After the end of World War Two, Alyoshin was extensively involved in reconstruction efforts, particularly of the Mariinskyi Palace and the Red University Building. He died in 1961.

== Early life ==
Alyoshin was born on 16 February 1881 in Kyiv, which was then part of the Kiev Governorate in the Russian Empire. His father was a carpenter who became part of an artel and was later a contractor. Alyoshin's grandfather was a serf craftsman who came from the Kursk Governorate and was also a deputy. He later noted that he "grew up on scaffolding." After finishing his schooling at a gymnasium, he entered the Kyiv Drawing School, from where he would graduate before going to St. Petersburg. He attended the school due to his results in drawing and painting from his gymnasium not being sufficient, and while in school also took drawing lessons from I. Seleznyov.

In 1899 he moved to St. Petersburg and enrolled at the Institute of Civil Engineers in St. Petersburg. At the school he was finally allowed to create actual architectural projects, and studied under famous Imperial Russian professors I. Mikhailovsky and Alexander Krasovsky. As he was named the best student in his class, the institute sent him to study abroad and become acquainted with Western architecture in 1900 and 1902, including in Austria, France, Germany, England, Italy, and Greece. In 1904 he graduated from the institute with a degree in civil engineering. He was rated "X" class by the school and immediately permitted to work on construction of roads and civil engineering projects, with a supplement stating that in 1903 he was awarded by the institute council the prize for best report on practical classes and silver for best architectural project. In 1903 he also got to supervise his first architectural project after competing to design a school named after M. Tereshchenko in Kyiv, where he was awarded first place and permitted to supervise under P.I. Hollandsky.

== Career ==
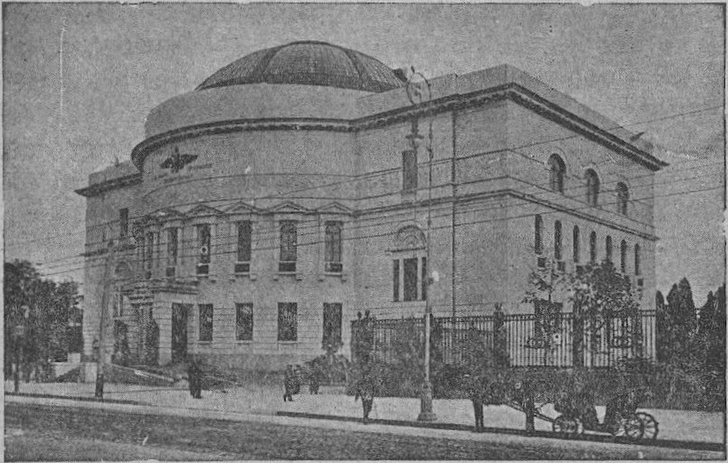
The Pedagogical Museum in 1937. Alyoshin was the designer of it.

In 1906 he started his first individual project in Kyiv, building the women's gymnasium for the city, which was finally completed in 1914. He also started working in 1907 on the building of the trade and industrial society in St. Petersburg, which was built using reinforced concrete and the newest finishing materials. In 1909 he completed his first version of the Pedagogical Museum named after Tsesarevych Oleksiy, which was funded by philanthropist Semyon Semenovich Mogilevtsev. In the First Men's Gymnasium, in July 1910, a land plot was allocated for the construction of the museum and construction started taking place, which was finally completed in August 1911. Alyoshin built the museum in an Empire style, which had fallen out of use since the Napoleonic period.

After completing the museum, he was hired for the buildings on Olesya Honchara Street, an apartment building at St. Vynohradna, and the mansion of the Kovalevsky family. The mansion, specifically, was created in a style that was similar to Italian palaces in a tribute to the Romanesque style. In the late 1910s he started working in a Ukrainian national style, particularly of the Hetmanate era. This was best seen when in 1914 he built a Ukrainian neo-baroque residential house for his father on Volodymyrska Street and in 1915 by the projects of a brick Orthodox church. In 1913, after his defeat for the design of the Provincial Zemstvo building due to his lack of "artistic knowledge", Alyoshin decided to return to school to study art.

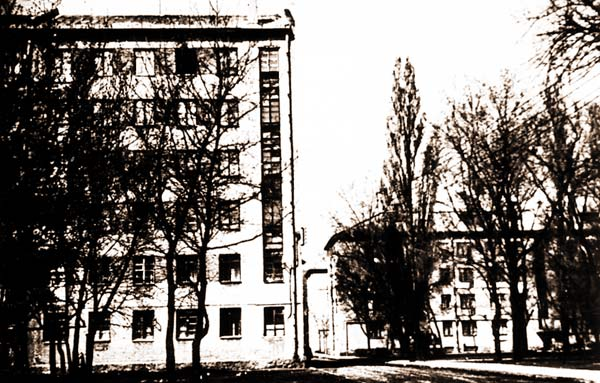
Buildings for the KhTZ city "New Kharkiv". Alyoshin was the designer for the incomplete city.

After passing the entrance exam to attend the Imperial Academy of Arts, he also attended there and studied under Leon Benois during this time period. In 1917 he graduated from the academy, and was granted the title of architect instead of previously just being a civil engineer. In 1917, during the Russian Revolution, Alyoshin decided to pivot his plan for the future and went to Murmansk to become the city's chief architect until 1918.

In 1918, after being the chief architect of Murmansk, he decided to move back to Kyiv and become the chief architect there until 1920. Afterward, he became a professor at the National Academy of Visual Arts and Architecture, which he continued to do for the rest of his life, teaching architects like Volodymyr Zabolotnyi and Joseph Karakis. In addition, from 1922 to 1924 he was Kyiv's provincial architect. He then built from 1928 to 1930 the doctors' residential buildings, called the "Doctor's House". He resided at the building from the time of its completion to his death. During 1930 to 1931 he was then the head of a team for the design of the sotsgorod city "New Kharkiv" by the existing city of Kharkiv for the 113 thousand inhabitants of the Kharkiv Tractor Plant. However, the city went uncompleted starting in 1933 after Stalinist architecture took over and the sotsgorod style became criticized. In 1937 he became a delegate to the First Congress of Soviet Architects of the USSR.

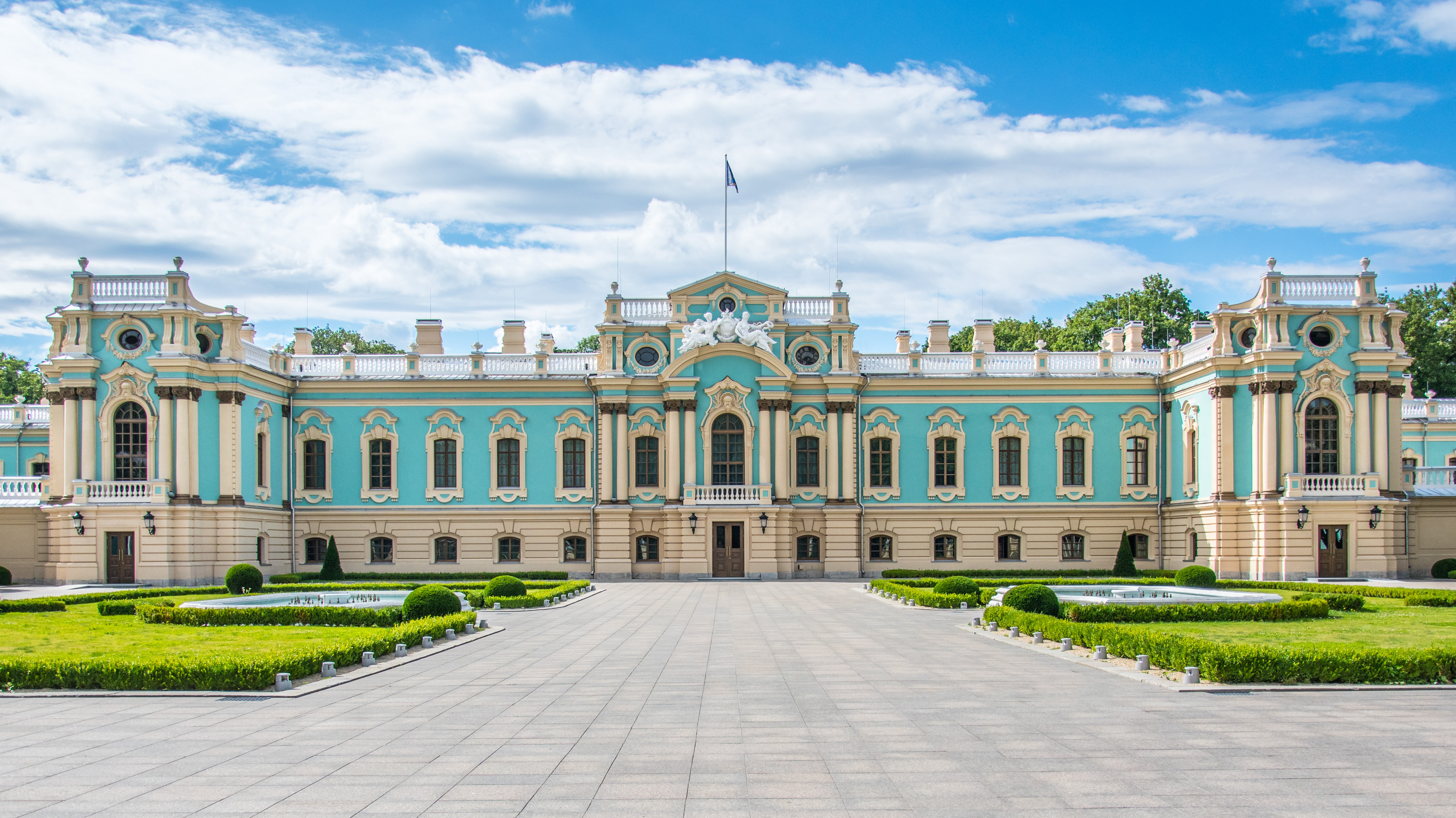
Alyoshin helped reconstruct Mariinskyi Palace after World War II.

After the end of World War Two, Alyoshin's career experienced a revival, as he was tasked with the reconstruction of many buildings that were damaged during the war. He helped reconstruct from 1944 to 1949 Mariinskyi Palace and the Red University Building of the Taras Shevchenko National University of Kyiv. In 1945 he was awarded second prize for the planning of the reconstruction of Khreshchatyk. He was also awarded the title of Doctor of Architecture in 1946 and became a full member of the Academy of Architecture of the Ukrainian SSR. His activity would then slow toward the end of his life, and in 1952 he completed some of his last works by writing the book "Architecture of School Buildings".

== Personal life ==
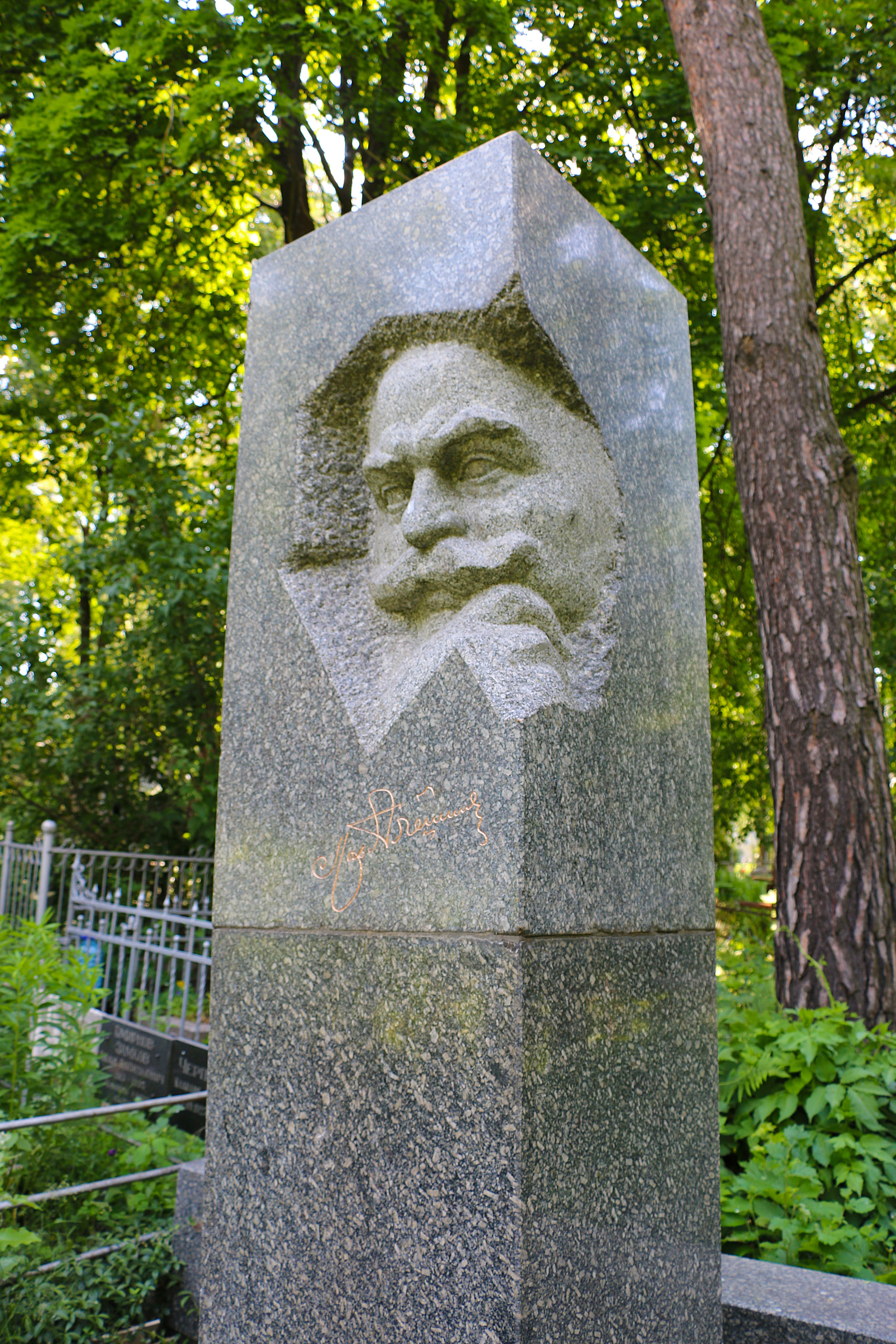
His grave at Lychakiv.

He had multiple children, including Fedot and Olga, and had grandchildren named Vadym and Oksana, who all went into architecture.

=== Death ===
He died on 7 October 1961 in Kyiv, where he had been working. He was buried at Lychakiv Cemetery.
