= Grand Hotel (Lviv) =

Hotel in Lviv, Ukraine

Coordinates: 49.8406°N 24.0269°E

Grand Hotel Lviv Casino&Spa
- Гранд Готель
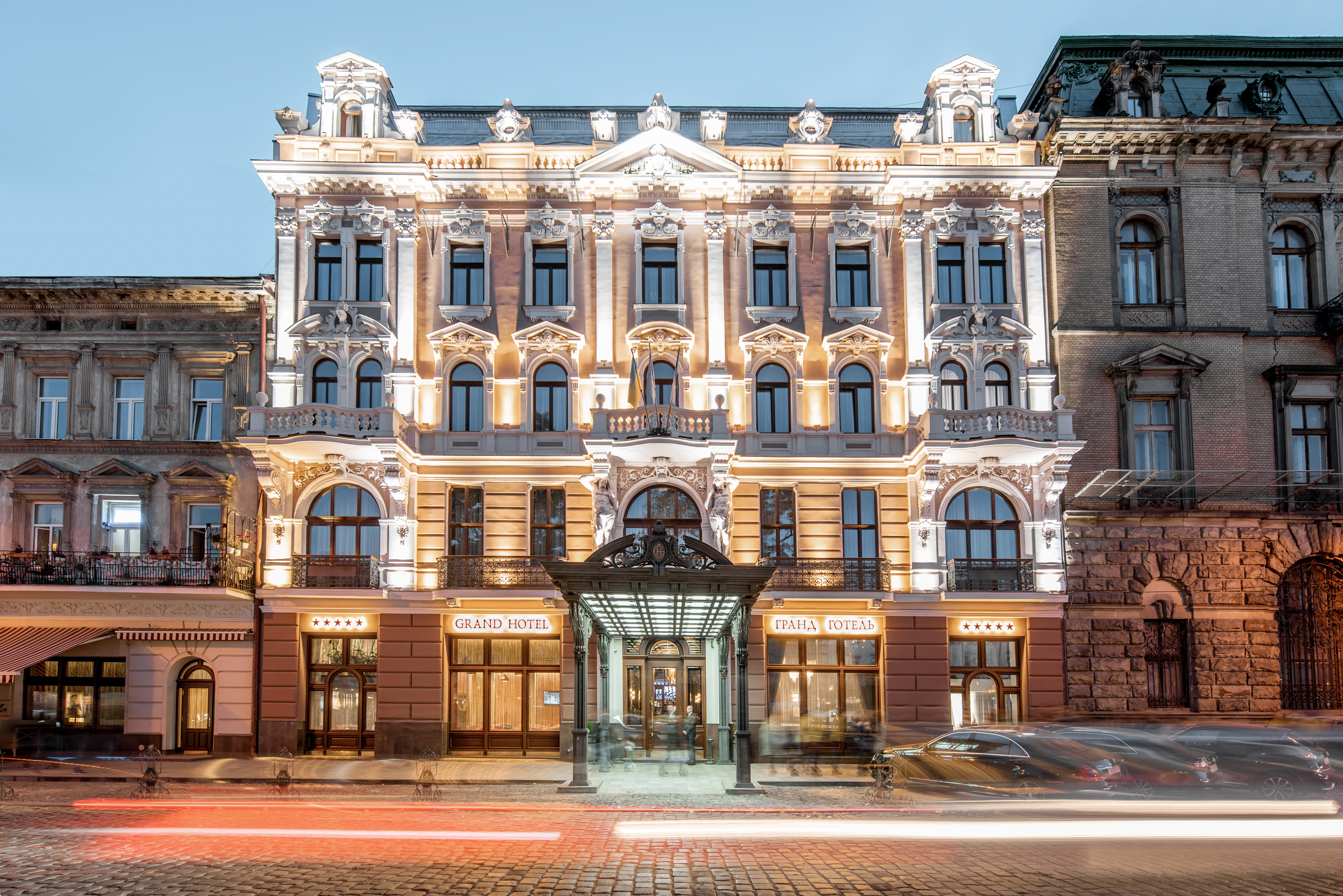
- Former names: Lviv; Verkhovyna

General information
- Architectural style: Baroque Revival
- Location: 13 Svobody Prospekt, Lviv, Ukraine
- Construction started: 1892
- Completed: 1894
- Opened: 1894
- Renovated: 1910; 1991-1992; 2014-2018
- Owner: Hryhorii Kozlovskyi

Design and construction
- Architects: Erazm Hermatnik; Zygmunt Kędzierski

Other information
- Number of rooms: 121

Website
- https://grand-hotel.com.ua

The Grand Hotel (Ukrainian: Ґранд Готель) is a hotel located in Lviv, Ukraine. It was opened in 1894 and has most recently been reconstructed between 2014 and 2018.

== History ==
The hotel was commissioned by Efraim Hausmann and was built between 1892 and 1894. The hotel was designed by Erazm Hermatnik while the atlases were designed by Leonard Marconi. After Hermatnik's death in 1893, the completion of the hotel's construction was overseen by architect Zygmunt Kędzierski. It replaced an earlier two-story Empire style building which served as police headquarters and which was the building where Leopold von Sacher-Masoch was born and where his father worked.

The hotel was opened under Walenty Schilling and Franciszek Heksel. The hotel had electric light throughout, in all public rooms and in every guestroom. There was running cold and hot water in every room, bath rooms on every floor. An electric motor lift transported travellers with ease to the upper floors. The entire building offered central heating in rooms and suites alike.

The accommodation ranged from single rooms to lavish family suites. Adjoining the lobby was a sumptuously furnished reading room.

As the owners pointed out in their opening advertisement: "For its above-mentioned advantages, as well as for its excellent service and reasonable prices, it deserves to be called the only first-class hotel in Lviv."

The hotel became famous for an outdoor shopping passage, Hausmann Passage, with the entrance at the present-day Svobody Prospekt and leading out to the present-day Doroshenka Street and Sichovych Striltsiv Street.

In 1910, the hotel was renovated for the first time by Edmund Żychowicz's architectural firm. In the 1930s, its ground floor was reconstructed.

During Soviet times, the hotel initially bore the name Lviv, and from 1964 Verkhovyna. In 1990, the hotel was purchased by Marta Fedoriv, as a result in undergoing extensive renovations in 1991-1992 and was once more renamed Grand Hotel.

Out of the 25 hotels that were present in Lviv during Austro-Hungarian and Polish periods, the Grand Hotel is one of just two that continue functioning as hotels to this day.

In 2014, the hotel was closed for renovation and reconstruction for a third time. The hotel was expected to reopen as a Crowne Plaza property, although in the end the decision was made to remain under its own brand. It was reopened at end of March 2018.

== Architecture ==
The hotel was designed in a Neo Baroque style by Erazm Hermatnik with construction overseen by Zygmunt Kędzierski after Hermatnik's death. The sculptures decorating the front façade were created by Leonard Marconi.

The hotel underwent three renovations in its history, in 1910, in 1991-1992 and finally in 2014-2018, though the original design of the building was largely left unaltered. During the second renovation, a stained glass panel designed by Hryhorii Komskyi was installed and was left intact during the most recent renovation. During the most recent renovation, the hotel was also expanded, with an additional wing added.

Since reopening, the hotel is significantly expanded, offering 121 rooms and suites, including one BDSM-themed suite to reflect the fact that Sacher-Masoch was born in a building that once stood in the hotel's present location. The hotel now also features a lobby bar, a 2,500m² spa and a conference hall.

== See also ==
- FC Rukh Lviv
