= Volodymyr Zabolotnyi (architect) =

Founder of the Academy of Architecture of Ukraine (1898–1962)

Volodymyr Hnatovych Zabolotny
- Володимир Гнатович Заболотний
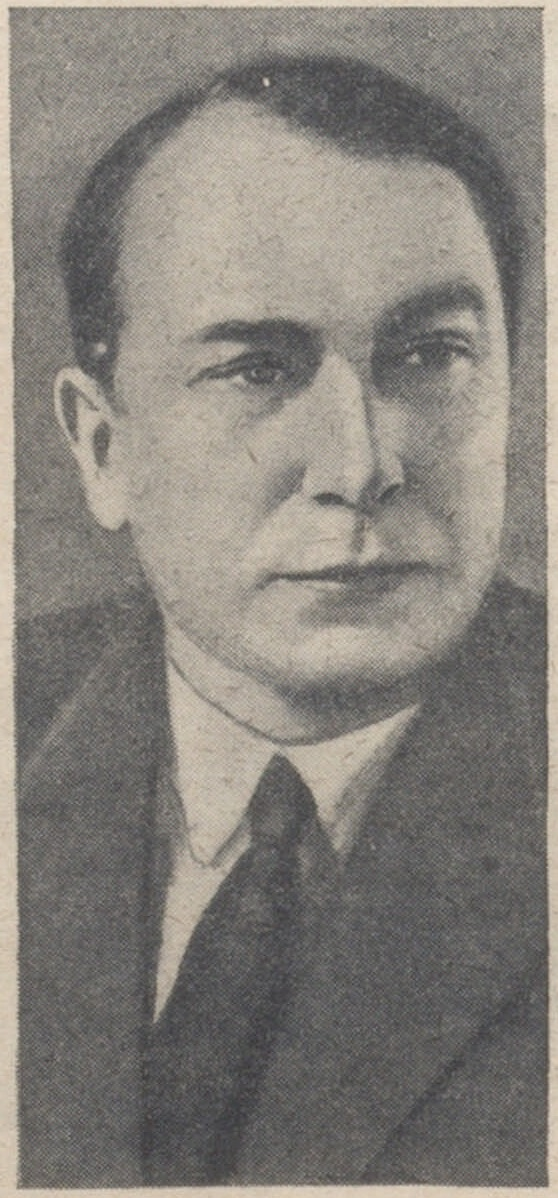
- Born: August 13, 1898; Karan village, Pereyaslavsky Uyezd, Poltava Governorate, Russian Empire
- Died: August 3, 1962 (aged 63); Kyiv, Ukrainian Soviet Socialist Republic, Soviet Union
- Occupation: Architect
- Known for: Founder of the Academy of Architecture of Ukraine

Volodymyr Hnatovych Zabolotny (Ukrainian: Володимир Гнатович Заболотний; August 13, 1898 – August 3, 1962) was a Soviet and Ukrainian architect, founder of the Academy of Architecture of Ukraine and designer of the Verkhovna Rada building, Government Palace (Kharkiv).

== Biography ==
Zabolotny was born on August 13 [O.S. August 1] 1898 in a family of craftsmen in the village of Karan (later renamed into Trubailivka) of Poltava Governorate, which today is part of the city of Pereiaslav. He finished the local high school during the Russian Civil War in 1919. In 1921–27, Zabolotny studied and successfully finished the National Academy of Visual Arts and Architecture as an architect-artist, which then went through a number of transformations and was known as Kyiv Arts Institute and was a descendant of the Ukrainian Academy of Arts (1917). By that time Ukraine was completely incorporated in the Soviet Union as the Ukrainian SSR (since 1922). In the institute, his instructor was the notable Russian architect Pavel Alyoshin. Zabolotny also was a member of the Association of Revolutionary Artists of Ukraine which was created in 1925 and the Association of Modern Architects. During his student years, he participated in competitions for design at the Palace of Culture in Rostov on Don (1925) and Kyiv Film Studios (1926).

After finishing Kyiv Arts Institute, Zabolotny worked as an instructor at the institute as well as at the Kyiv Engineer Construction Institute (today the Kyiv National University of Construction and Architecture). In 1929-33 he worked on the project design of the Kyiv-Pasazhyrskyi railway station as an assistant to Oleksandr Verbytsky. Among his own first works was Government Palace of the Ukrainian SSR (Kharkiv, 1927) and Residential Massif "Promin" (Kharkiv, 1928). At the beginning of 1930s, Zabolotny was a chief architect of DIPROMIST (Ukrainian State Science Research Institute of City Planning). At that time (1930) he created a city project for Kominternivske in Odesa Oblast. Along with it, Zabolotny also created a Palace of Culture of the Dnipro Metallurgical Combine in Kamianske and the Regional Consumer Association building in Vinnytsia.

After the capital had been transferred from Kharkiv to Kyiv, Zabolotny participated in the creation of the new Government Center in Kyiv (1935). In 1935–36, along with his students from the Kyiv Engineer Construction Institute, he built several pavilions in the Pioneer Park in Kyiv as well as a puppet theater, a cinema and two multi-story buildings on the Chervonoarmiyska and Tryokhsvyatytelska streets. His finest creation was the Verkhovna Rada building for which he received an honorary diploma from the Presidium of the Supreme Council of Ukraine and a prize of 5,000 rubles.
