= Soviet ship Zheleznyakov =

Four naval vessels of the Soviet Union have been named Zheleznyakov, after Anatoli Zhelezniakov:

- Soviet destroyer Zheleznyakov, a Fidonisy-class destroyer.
- Soviet monitor Zhelezniakov, a river monitor.
- Soviet cruiser Zheleznyakov, a Chapayev-class cruiser.
- Soviet minesweeper Anatoly Zheleznyakov, a Gorya-class minesweeper, still active in service with the Black Sea Fleet.
