= Baikove Cemetery =

Cemetery memorial in Kyiv, Ukraine

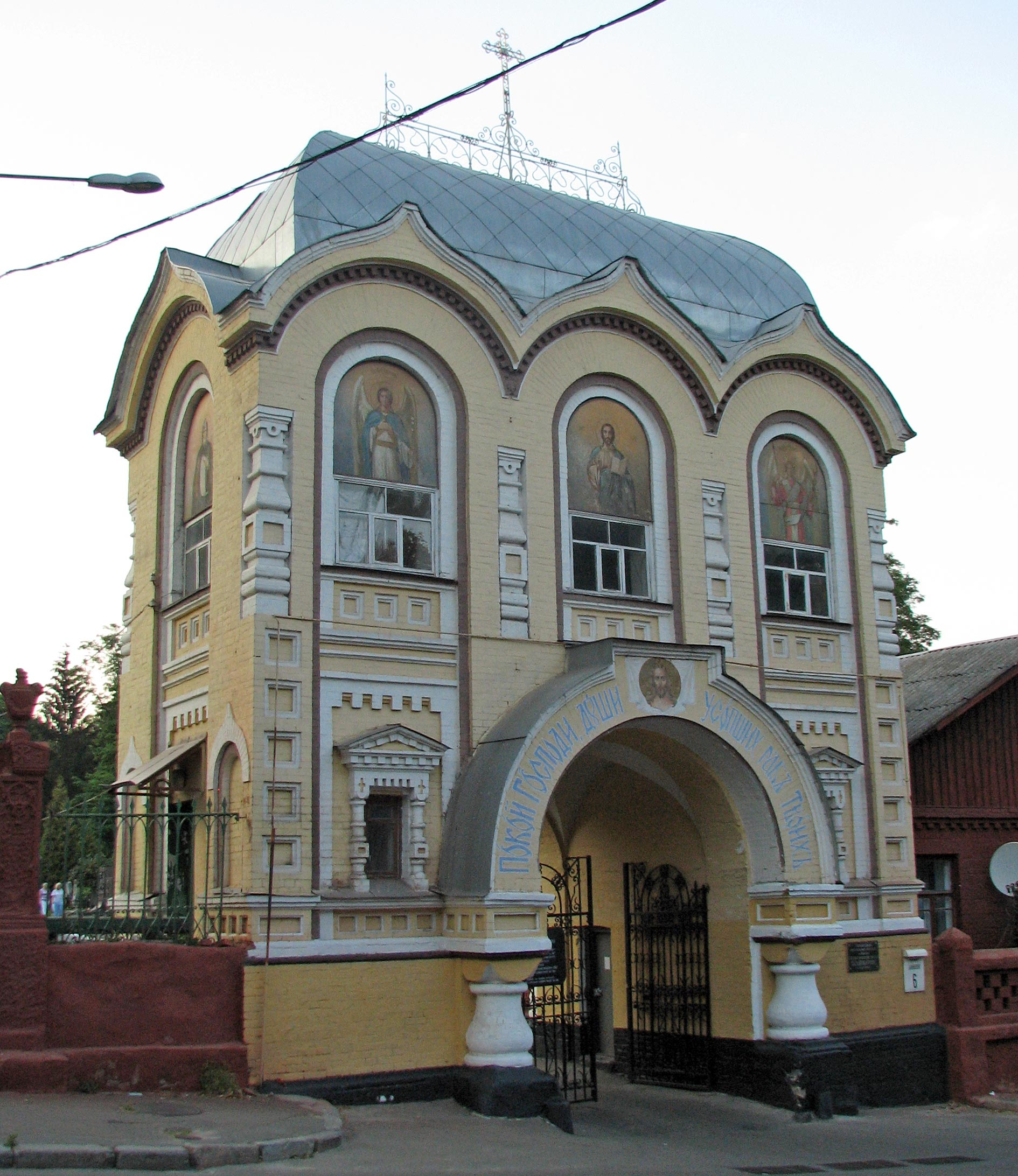
- Main entrance to Baikove Cemetery

- Location within Ukraine
- Location: Kyiv, Ukraine
- Coordinates: 50°25.00′N 30°30.35′E
- Area: 72.47 ha (179.1 acres)
- Established: 1833
- Named for: General Sergei Baikov

Immovable Monument of National Significance of Ukraine
- Official name: Комплекс пам'яток на Байковому кладовищі (Complex of monuments in the Baikove Cemetery)
- Type: History
- Reference no.: 260003-Н

Baikove Cemetery (Ukrainian: Байкове кладовище, romanized: Baikove kladovyshche) is a historic cemetery memorial in Holosiivskyi District of Kyiv, Ukraine. It is a National Historic Monument of Ukraine and is known as a necropolis of distinguished people.

== History ==
The cemetery was established in 1833 and was named after the nearby Baikovo estate. The oldest part of the cemetery is located south of the present Baikova Street. The biggest part is located north of the street and was established in the 1880s. It is partly surrounded by a wall. Besides the Orthodox graves there are also Catholic and Lutheran sections.

In Soviet times the Baikove cemetery became the main necropolis of Kyiv's intelligentsia, middle and upper classes. Many of the headstones became pieces of monumental art. Since Ukrainian independence in 1991, the cemetery has remained the most prestigious burial ground in the city. Eighty-seven plots are on the List of national landmarks of cultural heritage in Kyiv.

An Orthodox Church (Ascension of the Lord) in Byzantine style was built at the cemetery in 1884–1889. It was built on the proceeds from the sale of burial places. During Soviet times it was preserved as a memorial hall for funeral ceremonies. Today it is again used as a church. In 1975 a new crematorium in modern style was built in the western part of the cemetery.

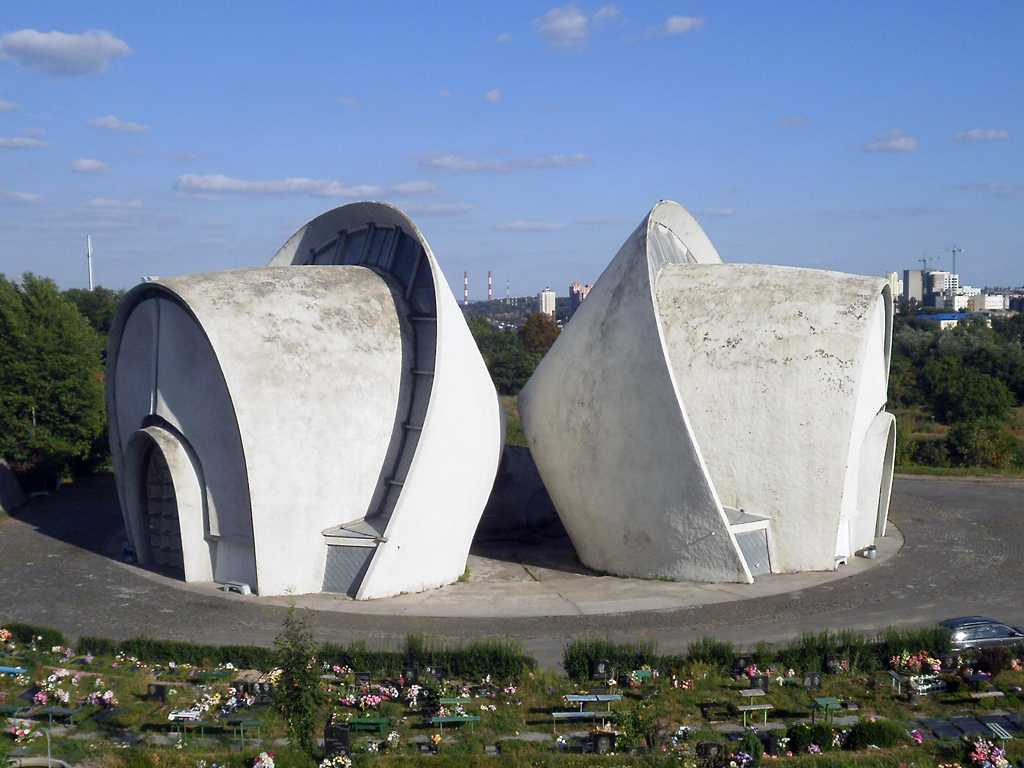
Crematorium by Avraham Miletski

== Notable burials ==
- Leonid Kravchuk (1934–2022) – politician and president of Ukraine (1991–1994).
- Mykhailo Hrushevsky (1866–1934) – politician, academician, historian and president of Ukrainian People's Republic (1917–1918).
- Lesya Ukrainka (1871–1913) – poet and writer.
- Viacheslav Chornovil (1937–1999) – politician and Soviet dissident.
- Slava Stetsko (1920–2003) – politician.
- Viktor Ivanov (1909–1981) – film director.
- Oles Honchar (1918–1995) – writer and politician.
- Ivan Nechuy-Levytsky (1838–1918) – writer.
- Oleg Antonov (1906–1984) – aircraft designer.
- Danylo Lyder (1917–2002) – theatre director.
- Olena Pchilka (1849–1930) – writer and ethnographer.
- Mykhailo Starytsky (1840–1904) – writer.
- Leonid Kadeniuk (1951–2018) – astronaut.
- Mykola Lysenko (1842–1912) – composer and pianist.
- Oleksandr Bilash (1931–2003) – composer and author.
- Ostap Vyshnya (1889–1956) – writer.
- Yuriy Mushketyk (1929–2019) – writer and journalist.
- Vasyl Stus (1938–1985) – poet, translator, literary critic, journalist, and an active member of the Ukrainian dissident movement
- Ivan Mykolaichuk (1941–1987) – actor.
- Vikentiy Khvoyka (1850–1914) – archaeologist.
- Volodymyr Shcherbytsky (1918–1990) – politician.
- Leonid Telyatnikov (1951–2004) – Chernobyl firefighter.
- Mikhail Vaschenko-Zakharchenko (1825–1912) – mathematician.
- Vadym Hetman (1935–1998) – statesman and politician.
- Volodymyr Zabolotnyi (1898–1962) – architect.
- Hryhoriy Veryovka (1895–1964) – composer and choir director.
- Viktor Bannikov (1938–2001) – football player and official.
- Valeriy Lobanovskyi (1939–2002) – football manager.
- James Mace (1952–2004) – American historian and researcher of Holodomor.
- Vasyl Stepanchenko (1914–1995) – aircraft engineer and a Hero of Socialist Labour.
- Aleksey Kovalev (1926–1997) – the soldier who raised the Soviet flag over Berlin.
- Mariia Starytska (1865–1930) – actress and director.
- Anatoliy Konkov (1949–2024) – football player, manager and official.
- Mykola Karpyuk (1964–2026) – political activist and soldier, member of UNA-UNSO.

== Gallery ==
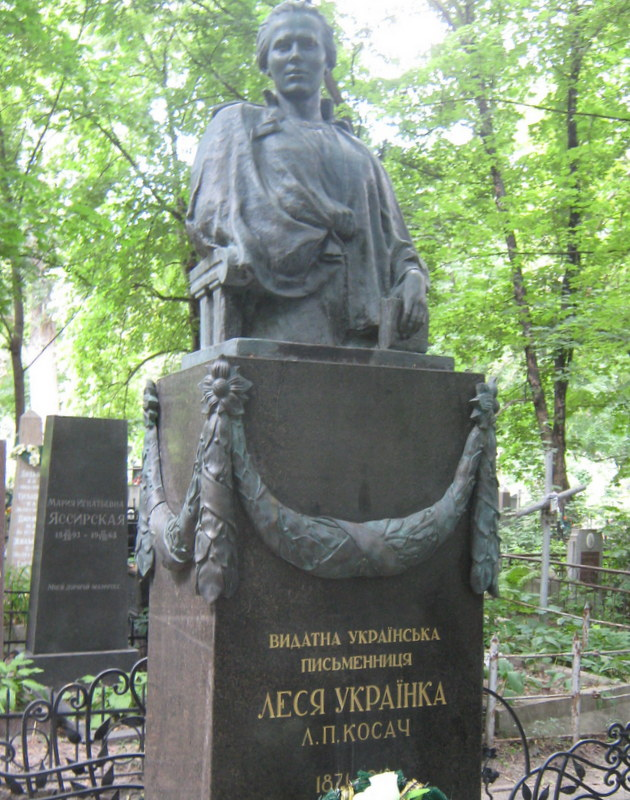
The writer Lesya Ukrainka's grave

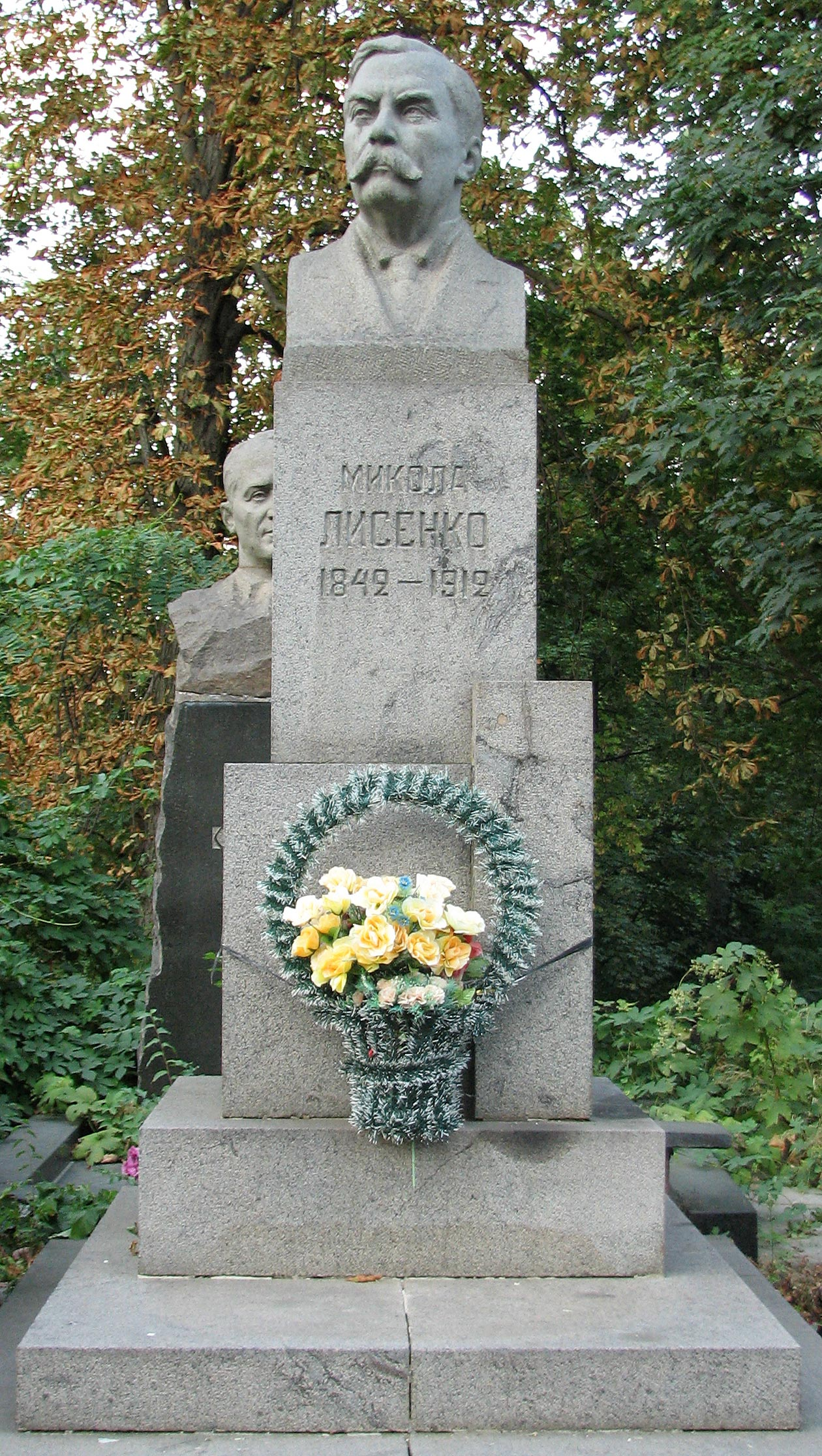
The composer Mykola Lysenko's grave

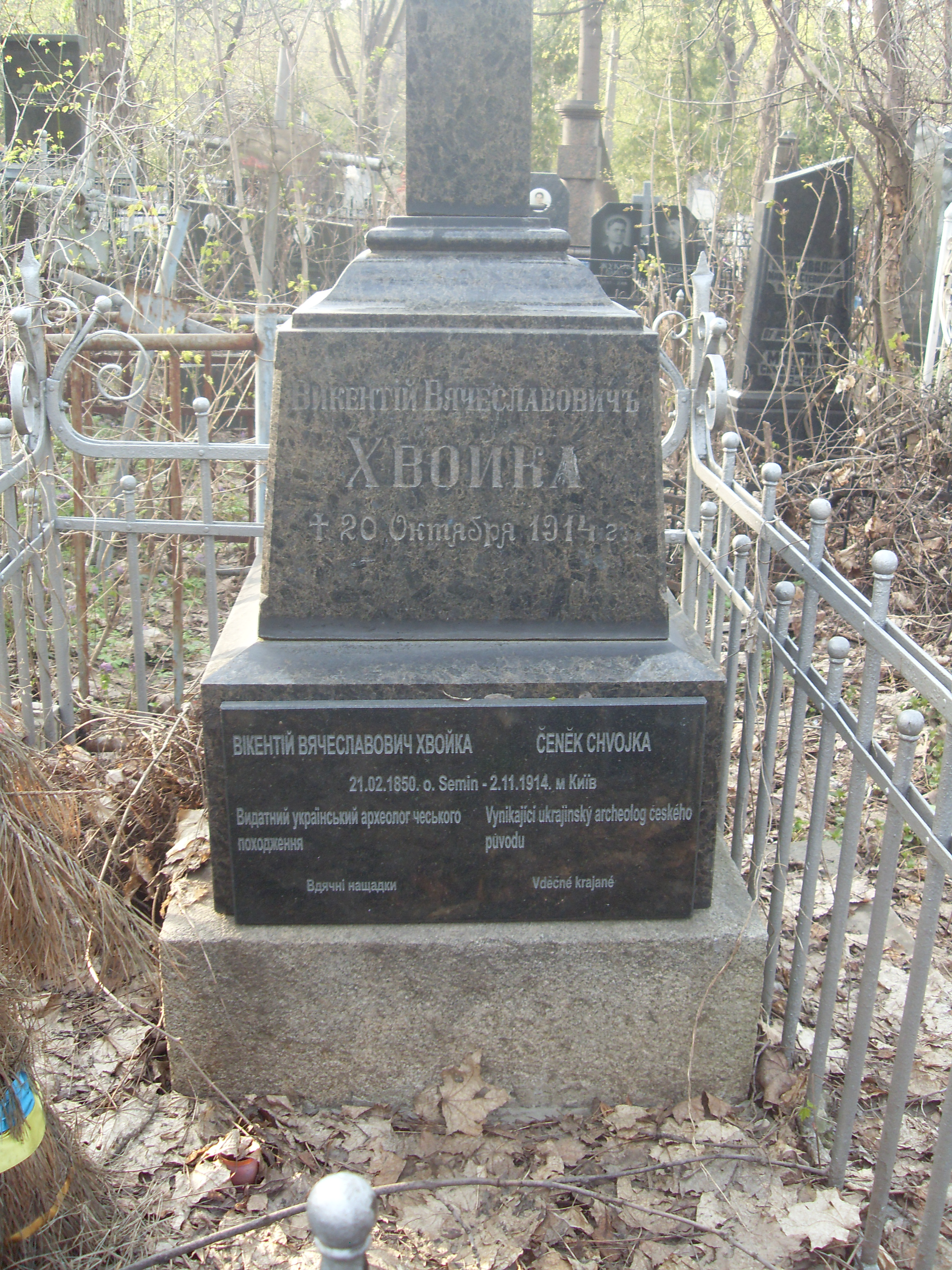
Vikentiy Khvoyka's grave

== See also ==
- People buried at the Baikove
- List of cemeteries in Kyiv
- List of cultural heritage landmarks of national significance in Kyiv
- Kuialnyk Cemetery in Odesa
