= Monuments of national significance in Kyiv =

List of cultural heritage monuments of national significance in Kyiv — the capital city of Ukraine.

== List of monuments of national significance ==
=== Monuments of history ===
No.	Photo	Name	Date	Location	Type	Protected number
1		Memorial Complex in honour of perished civilian citizens and Soviet prisoners of war at the place of former fascist concentration camp (Darnytsia)	1968	Academician Horbunov Street	monument of history	260001-N
2		Mikhail Bulgakov House of Residence	end of 19th – start of 20th century	13 Andriyivskyy Descent	monument of history	260002-N
3		Complex of monuments at Baikove Cemetery	mid of 19th – start of 20th century	6 Baikova Street	monument of history	260003-N
Complex of monuments at Baikove Cemetery (featured list start)
4		Nikolai Amosov Grave	2002	Baikove Cemetery, sector 50a	monument of history	260003/1-N
5		Fedir Anders Grave	1926	Baikove Cemetery, sector 5	monument of history	260003/2-N
6		Leonid Bykov Grave	1979	Baikove Cemetery, sector 33	monument of history	260003/3-N
7		Amvrosiy Buchma Grave	1957	Baikove Cemetery, sector 2	monument of history	260003/4-N
8		Vincent Beretti Grave	1842	Baikove Cemetery (Old Polish)	monument of history	260003/5-N
9		Alexander Beretti Grave	1896	Baikove Cemetery (Old Polish)	monument of history	260003/6-N
10		Wanda Wasilewska Grave	1964	Baikove Cemetery, sector 2	monument of history	260003/7-N
11		Stepan Vasylchenko Grave	1932	Baikove Cemetery, sector 1	monument of history	260003/8-N
12		Pavlo Virsky Grave	1975	Baikove Cemetery, sector 1	monument of history	260003/9-N
13		Mykhailo Verykivsky Grave	1962	Baikove Cemetery, sector 8	monument of history	260003/10-N
14		Hryhoriy Veryovka Grave	1964	Baikove Cemetery, sector 7	monument of history	260003/11-N
15		Ostap Vyshnya Grave	1956	Baikove Cemetery, sector 2	monument of history	260003/12-N
16		Zoia Gaidai Grave	1965	Baikove Cemetery, sector 43	monument of history	260003/13-N
17		Vadym Hetman Grave	1998	Baikove Cemetery, sector 50a	monument of history	260003/14-N
18		Mykola Hlushchenko Grave	1977	Baikove Cemetery, sector 43	monument of history	260003/15-N
19		Borys Hmyria Grave	1969	Baikove Cemetery, sector 1	monument of history	260003/16-N
20		Andriy Holovko Grave	1972?	Baikove Cemetery, sector 33	monument of history	260003/17-N
21		Ivan Honchar Grave	1993	Baikove Cemetery, sector 33	monument of history	260003/18-N
22		Oles Honchar Grave	1995	Baikove Cemetery, sector 7	monument of history	260003/19-N
23		Borys Hrinchenko Grave	1910	Baikove Cemetery, sector 9	monument of history	260003/20-N
24		Mykhailo Hryshko Grave	1973	Baikove Cemetery, sector 1	monument of history	260003/21-N
25		Mykhailo Hrushevsky Grave	1934	Baikove Cemetery, sector 8	monument of history	260003/22-N
26		Grave of Porfyriy Demutsky and Danylo Demutsky	1927, 1954	Baikove Cemetery, sector 2	monument of history	260003/23-N
27		Dniprova Chayka Grave	1927	Baikove Cemetery, sector 2	monument of history	260003/24-N
28		Viktor Drobotko Grave	1966	Baikove Cemetery, sector 1	monument of history	260003/25-N
29		Pavlo Zhytetsky Grave	1911	Baikove Cemetery, sector 1	monument of history	260003/26-N
30		Volodymyr Zabolotny Grave	1962	Baikove Cemetery, sector 1	monument of history	260003/27-N
31		Maria Zankovetska Grave	1934	Baikove Cemetery, sector 2	monument of history	260003/28-N
32		Vasyl Zemliak Grave	1977	Baikove Cemetery, sector 1	monument of history	260003/29-N
33		Ivan Yizhakevych Grave	1962	Baikove Cemetery, sector 19	monument of history	260003/30-N
34		Ivan Kavaleridze Grave	1978	Baikove Cemetery, sector 50	monument of history	260003/31-N
35		Halyna Kalchenko Grave	1975	Baikove Cemetery, sector 1	monument of history	260003/32-N
36		Volodymyr Karavayev Grave	1892	Baikove Cemetery, sector 1	monument of history	260003/33-N
37		Vasyl Kasiyan Grave	1976	Baikove Cemetery, sector 2	monument of history	260003/34-N
38		Sydir Kovpak Grave	1967	Baikove Cemetery, sector 6	monument of history	260003/35-N
39		Pylyp Kozytskiy Grave	1960	Baikove Cemetery, sector 8	monument of history	260003/36-N
40		Oleksandr Konysky Grave	1900	Baikove Cemetery, sector 1	monument of history	260003/37-N
41		Oleksandr Kopylenko Grave	1958	Baikove Cemetery, sector 8a	monument of history	260003/38-N
42		Viktor Kosenko Grave	1938	Baikove Cemetery, sector 8	monument of history	260003/39-N
43		Oleksandr Korniychuk Grave	1972	Baikove Cemetery, sector 2	monument of history	260003/40-N
44		Ivan Kocherha Grave	1952	Baikove Cemetery, sector 1	monument of history	260003/41-N
45		Fotiy Krasytsky Grave	1944	Baikove Cemetery (old), sector 4	monument of history	260003/42-N
46		Aleksei Krymov Grave	1954	Baikove Cemetery, sector 43	monument of history	260003/43-N
47		Marian Krushelnytsky Grave	1963	Baikove Cemetery, sector 2	monument of history	260003/44-N
48		Ivan Le Grave	1978	Baikove Cemetery, sector 1	monument of history	260003/45-N
49		Mykola Lysenko Grave	1912	Baikove Cemetery, sector 1	monument of history	260003/46-N
50		Mykhailo Lysenko Grave	1972	Baikove Cemetery, sector 1	monument of history	260003/47-N
51		Yuriy Lytvyn Grave	1984	Baikove Cemetery, sector 33	monument of history	260003/48-N
52		Maria Lytvynenko-Wohlgemuth Grave	1966	Baikove Cemetery, sector 1	monument of history	260003/49-N
53		Valeriy Lobanovskyi Grave	2002	Baikove Cemetery, sector 50a	monument of history	260003/50-N
54		Boris Lyatoshinsky Grave	1968	Baikove Cemetery, sector 6	monument of history	260003/51-N
55		Andriy Malyshko Grave	1970	Baikove Cemetery, sector 1	monument of history	260003/52-N
56		Ivan Mykolaichuk Grave	1987	Baikove Cemetery, sector 33	monument of history	260003/53-N
57		Heorhiy Narbut Grave	1920	Baikove Cemetery, sector 2	monument of history	260003/54-N
58		Ivan Nechuy-Levytsky Grave	1918	Baikove Cemetery, sector 2	monument of history	260003/55-N
59		Petro Panch Grave	1978	Baikove Cemetery, sector 43a	monument of history	260003/56-N
60		Aleksandr Palladin Grave	1972	Baikove Cemetery (new), sector 1	monument of history	260003/57-N
61		Evgeny Paton Grave	1953	Baikove Cemetery, sector 1	monument of history	260003/58-N
62		Anatol Petrytsky Grave	1964	Baikove Cemetery, sector 2	monument of history	260003/59-N
63		Leonid Pervomayskiy Grave	1973	Baikove Cemetery, sector 2	monument of history	260003/60-N
64		Oksana Petrusenko Grave	1940	Baikove Cemetery, sector 8	monument of history	260003/61-N
65		Ivan Patorzhynsky Grave	1960	Baikove Cemetery, sector 8a	monument of history	260003/62-N
66		Mykailo Ptukha Grave	1961	Baikove Cemetery, sector 8	monument of history	260003/63-N
67		Natan Rybak Grave	1978	Baikove Cemetery, sector 1	monument of history	260003/64-N
68		Levko Revutsky Grave	1977	Baikove Cemetery, sector 2	monument of history	260003/65-N
69		Maksym Rylsky Grave	1964	Baikove Cemetery, sector 1	monument of history	260003/66-N
70		Panas Saksahansky Grave	1940	Baikove Cemetery, sector 1	monument of history	260003/67-N
71		Mykola Sadovsky Grave	1933	Baikove Cemetery, sector 1	monument of history	260003/68-N
72		Mykhailo Skorulskyi Grave	1950	Baikove Cemetery, sector 43	monument of history	260003/69-N
73		Yuriy Smolych Grave	1976	Baikove Cemetery, sector 2	monument of history	260003/70-N
74		Nikolai Solovtsov Grave	1902	Baikove Cemetery, sector 1	monument of history	260003/71-N
75		Volodymyr Sosiura Grave	1965	Baikove Cemetery, sector 1	monument of history	260003/72-N
76		Mykhailo Starytsky Grave	1904	Baikove Cemetery, sector 1	monument of history	260003/73-N
77		Yakiv Stepovy Grave	1921	Baikove Cemetery, sector 7	monument of history	260003/74-N
78		Slava Stetsko Grave	2003	Baikove Cemetery, sector 33	monument of history	260003/75-N
79		Vasyl Stus Grave	1985	Baikove Cemetery, sector 33	monument of history	260003/76-N
80		Oleksiy Tykhyi Grave	1984	Baikove Cemetery, sector 33	monument of history	260003/77-N
81		Pavlo Tychyna Grave	1967	Baikove Cemetery, sector 1	monument of history	260003/78-N
82		Mykola Tereshchenko Grave	1966	Baikove Cemetery, sector 1	monument of history	260003/79-N
83		Lesya Ukrainka Grave	1913	Baikove Cemetery (old), sector 3	monument of history	260003/80-N
84		Vikentiy Khvoyka Grave	1914	Baikove Cemetery (old Polish)	monument of history	260003/81-N
85		Viacheslav Chornovil Grave	1999	Baikove Cemetery, sector 1	monument of history	260003/82-N
86		Volodymyr Shcherbytsky Grave	1990	Baikove Cemetery, sector 1	monument of history	260003/83-N
87		Yuriy Shumsky Grave	1954	Baikove Cemetery, sector 2	monument of history	260003/84-N
88		Gnat Yura Grave	1966	Baikove Cemetery, sector 1	monument of history	260003/85-N
89		Tetyana Yablonska Grave	2005	Baikove Cemetery, sector 2	monument of history	260003/86-N
90		Yuriy Yanovsky Grave	1954	Baikove Cemetery, sector 2	monument of history	260003/87-N
Complex of monuments at Baikove Cemetery (featured list end)
91		Memorial Complex in memory of victims of the 1930s political repressions	1937-1941	Bykivnia	monument of history	260004-N
92		Manor House Complex of Bogomoletz Institute of Physiology	20th century	2-4 Oleksandr Bogomolets Street	monument of history	260005-N
93		Konstantin Ushinsky Grave	1870	Vydubychi Monastery	monument of history	260006-N
94		Taras Shevchenko House of Residence	mid 19th century	5 Vyshhorod Street	monument of history	260008-N
95		Presidium building of National Academy of Sciences	start of 20th century	54 Saint Vladimir Street	monument of history	260014-N
96		Building of Pedagogic Museum	start of 20th century	57 Saint Vladimir Street	monument of history	260015-N
97		Building complex of the Taras Shevchenko National University	19th century	58, 60, 62 Saint Vladimir Street; 14 Taras Shevchenko Boulevard	monument of history	260016-N
98		Nikolai Vatutin Grave	1944	Mariinskyi Park	monument of history	260019-N
99		Complex of monuments of Lukianivske Cemetery	1878-mid 20th century	7 Dorohozhych Street	monument of history	260020-N
Complex of monuments of Lukianivske Cemetery (featured list start)
100		Oleksandr Murashko Grave	1919	7 Dorohozhych Street	monument of history	260020/1-N
101		Pyotr Nesterov Grave	1914	7 Dorohozhych Street	monument of history	260020/2-N
102		Mykola Pymonenko Grave	1912	7 Dorohozhych Street	monument of history	260020/3-N
103		Hryhoriy Svitlytsky Grave	1948	7 Dorohozhych Street	monument of history	260020/4-N
Complex of monuments of Lukianivske Cemetery (featured list end)
104		Vincent Chvojka House of Residence	end of 19- start of 20th centuries	9/1 Igor's Street	monument of history	260022-N
105		Kyiv-Mohyla Academy building complex	17-20th centuries	Podil	monument of history	260025-N
106		Grave of Cossack officers Iskra and Kochubei	1708	21 Ivan Mazepa Street	monument of history	260031-N
107		Complex of monument at the place of mass execution of civilian population and prisoners of war at the Babi Yar tract at times of Hitlerite occupation	1941-1943	Babi Yar	monument of history	260033-N
108		Monument in honor of granting to Kyiv the Magdeburg rights	1802 - 1808	8 Embankment Highway	monument of history	260035-N
109		Askoldova Mohyla	9-20th centuries	Park Road	monument of history	260036-N
110		Mykhailo Hrushevsky House of Residence	start 20th century	9 Pankiv Street	monument of history	260037-N
111		Kyiv Polytechnic Institute Building Complex	end of 19-start of 20th centuries	37-39 Victory Parkway	monument of history	260038-N
112		Oleksandr Dovzhenko National Film Studios Building Complex	1927 - 1928	44 Victory Parkway	monument of history, science and technology	260039-N
113		Mykola Lysenko House of Residence	1890s	956 Saksahansky Street	monument of history	260042-N
114		Lesya Ukrainka House of Residence	1898	97 Saksahansky Street	monument of history	260043-N
115		Memorial Complex of Park "Vichnoyi Slavy"	1957	Glory Square	monument of history	260044-N
116		Memorial to servicemen of Internal Affairs agencies perished on the line of duty	1996–1997	Solomianka Square	monument of monumental art, history	260045-N
117		Building of the First Private Museum of Bohdan and Varvara Khanenkos	end of 19 - start of 20th centuries	15/17 Tereshchenko Street	monument of history	260049-N
118		Kyiv Museum of Russian Arts Building	end of 19 - start of 20th centuries	9 Tereshchenko Street	monument of history	260050-N
119		Taras Shevchenko House of Residence	1820	8a Taras Shevchenko Lane	monument of history	260054-N
120		Kyiv Theological Seminary	1888—1901	20 Voznesensky descent	monument of history, architecture	260061-N
121		Monitor Zhelezniakov	1941—1945	26 Electricians Street	monument of science and technology, history	260062-N
122		Manor house of the Murashko family of artists	1858—1914	14 Little Zhytomyr Street	monument of history, architecture	260063-N
Manor house of the Murashko family of artists (featured list start)
123		Oleksandr Murashko House of Residence	1858	14 Little Zhytomyr Street	monument of history, architecture	260063/1-N
124		Private building with the Oleksandr Murashko's shop	1898	14a Little Zhytomyr Street	monument of history, architecture	260063/2-N
125		House wing	end of 19th century	14b Little Zhytomyr Street	monument of history, architecture	260063/3-N
Manor house of the Murashko family of artists (featured list end)

=== Monuments of archaeology ===
No.	Photo	Name	Date	Location	Type	Protected number
1		Occupation earth of Vydubychi locality	9–13th centuries	Vydubychi Monastery	monument of archaeology	260007-N
2		City of Volodymyr – detinets of old Kyiv with foundation of church of the Tithes	5-9th centuries	streets Saint Vladimir, Great Zhytomyr and Starokyivska Hora	monument of archaeology	260010-N
3		Foundation and wall remnants rotunda	9-13th centuries	3 Saint Vladimir Street	monument of archaeology	260012-N
4		Church foundation of Fedoriv Monastery	9-13th centuries	7-9 Saint Vladimir Street	monument of archaeology	260013-N
5		St. George Church foundations	9-13th centuries	2 Saint George Lane	monument of archaeology	260018-N
6		Palace foundation	9-13th centuries	Irene's Street	monument of archaeology	260023-N
7		St. Irina Church foundations	9-13th centuries	corner of St. Irene and St. Volodymyr streets	monument of archaeology	260024-N
8		Kytaiv hillfort and kurgan burials	9-13th centuries	15 Kytayiv Street	monument of archaeology	260026-N
9		Occupation earth of the ancient Kyiv's district Klov	9-13th centuries	Klov tract	monument of archaeology	260027-N
10		Occupation earth of the City of Yaroslav	9-13th centuries		monument of archaeology	260028-N
11		Yurkovytsia hillfort and burial	9-13th centuries	Lysa Hora	monument of archaeology	260029-N
12		Lach Gates foundations	9-13th centuries	Maidan Nezalezhnosti	monument of archaeology	260032-N
13		Zvirynets Caves	11-start of 17th centuries	18-22 Michurin Street	monument of archaeology	260034-N
14		Old Ruthenian settlement	9-13th centuries	Nyvky Park	monument of archaeology	260041-N
15		Church foundations	9-13th centuries	7/6 Rifleman Street	monument of archaeology	260047-N
16		Occupation earth of Berestove	9-13th centuries	Glory Park	monument of archaeology	260048-N
17		Craftsmen district of ancient Kyiv – occupation earth of the City of Izyaslav Svyatopolk	9-13th centuries	2-4 Three Saints Street	monument of archaeology	260051-N
18		Kyrylivska staying site of prehistoric people	Paleolithic epoch	59-61 Frunze Street	monument of archaeology	260052-N
19		Bourgogne Theatre	second half of 19th century	5/15 Bohdan Khmelnytskyi Street	monument of archaeology	260053-N
20		Theotokos Church foundations of Klov Monastery	11th century	27 Shovkovychna Street	monument of archaeology	260056-N
21		Foundations of stone church	first half of 12th century	3 Yurkiv Street	monument of archaeology	260057-N
22		Occupation earth of hillfort	9-13th centuries	Shchekavytsia	monument of archaeology	260058-N
23		Occupation earth of hillfort "Fine court of Prince Vsevolod"	9-13th centuries	Chaika Cape	monument of archaeology	260059-N
24		Occupation earth of Uhorske	9-13th centuries	Askold's Grave	monument of archaeology	260060-N

=== Monuments of monumental art ===
No.	Photo	Name	Date	Location	Type	Protected number
1		Prince Volodymyr Monument	1853	Saint Vladimir Hill	monument of monumental art	260009-N
2		Monument to Mykhailo Hrushevsky	1998	57 Saint Vladimir Street	monument of monumental art	260011-N
3		Monument to Taras Shevchenko	1939	Taras Shevchenko park	monument of monumental art	260017-N
4		Monument to the crew of Tarashchanets armour train	1974	Tarashchanets Park	monument of monumental art	260021-N
5		Monument to Lesya Ukrainka	1973	Lesya Ukrainka Square	monument of monumental art	260030-N
6		Monument to Alexander Pushkin	1962	Pushkin Park	monument of monumental art	260040-N
7		Memorial to servicemen of Internal Affairs agencies perished on the line of duty	1996–1997	Solomianka Square	monument of monumental art, history	260045-N
8		Monument to Bohdan Khmelnytsky	1888	Sophia Square	monument of monumental art	260046-N
9		Monument to Mykola Shchors	1954	Taras Shevchenko Boulevard	monument of monumental art	260055-N

=== Monuments of urban planning ===
No.	Photo	Name	Date	Location	Type	Protected number
1		Zamkova Hora – Andriyivskyy Descent	9th-13th century	Andriyivskyy Descent	monument of urban planning	260060-N
2		Lysohirskyi Fort of Kyiv Fortress	1871—1875	78 Sapper-Sloboda Street	monument of urban planning	260066-N
3		Zvirynets fortifications of Kyiv Fortress	1810	1 Tymiriaziev Street	monument of urban planning	260067-N
4		Moates and barrows of the Kyiv Fortress Hospital fortifications	1842—1849	Streets Hospital, Shchors and Lesya Ukrainka Boulevard	monument of urban planning, architecture	260068-N
5		Kyiv Fortress earth fortifications of citadel with bastions	18th century	Pechersk	monument of urban planning, architecture	260069-N
6		Vasylkiv fortifications moats and barrows of Kyiv Fortress	1832—1839	Pechersk	monument of urban planning, architecture	260070-N

=== Monuments of architecture ===
No.	Photo	Name	Date	Location	Type	Protected number
1		Kyiv Theological Seminary	1888—1901	20 Voznesensky descent	monument of history, architecture	260061-N
2		Manor house of the Murashko family of artists	1858—1914	14 Little Zhytomyr Street	monument of history, architecture	260063-N
Manor house of the Murashko family of artists (featured list start)
3		Oleksandr Murashko House of Residence	1858	14 Little Zhytomyr Street	monument of history, architecture	260063/1-N
4		Private building with the Oleksandr Murashko's shop	1898	14a Little Zhytomyr Street	monument of history, architecture	260063/2-N
5		House wing	end of 19th century	14b Little Zhytomyr Street	monument of history, architecture	260063/3-N
Manor house of the Murashko family of artists (featured list end)
6		St. Alexander Kosciol	1817—1849	17 Kosciol Street	monument of architecture	260064-N
7		Residential House	second half of 19th century	20/2 Sahaidachny Street	monument of architecture	260065-N
8		Moates and barrows of the Kyiv Fortress Hospital fortifications	1842—1849	Streets Hospital, Shchors and Lesya Ukrainka Boulevard	monument of urban planning, architecture	260068-N
9		Kyiv Fortress earth fortifications of citadel with bastions	18th century	Pechersk	monument of urban planning, architecture	260069-N
10		Vasylkiv fortifications moats and barrows of Kyiv Fortress	1832—1839	Pechersk	monument of urban planning, architecture	260070-N

=== Monuments of science and technology ===
No.	Photo	Name	Date	Location	Type	Protected number
1		Oleksandr Dovzhenko National Film Studios Building Complex	1927 - 1928	44 Victory Parkway	monument of history, science and technology	260039-N
2		Monitor Zhelezniakov	1941—1945	26 Electricians Street	monument of science and technology, history	260062-N

=== Monument ensembles ===
- Complex of monuments at Baikove Cemetery (as monument of history) featuring 87 monuments
- Complex of monuments of Lukianivske Cemetery (as monument of history) featuring 4 monuments
- Manor house of the Murashko family of artists (as monument of history and architecture) featuring 3 monuments

== List of historic and cultural reserves ==
- National Reserve "Sophia of Kyiv" (historic and architectural)
- National Kyiv-Pechersk Historic and Cultural Reserve
- State Historic and Architectural Reserve "Ancient Kyiv"
- State Historic and Memorial Reserve of Lukianivka
- National Historic and Memorial Reserve "Bykivnia graves"

== List of scientific objects of national inheritance (heritage) ==
Note: it is a mixed list that includes objects of both cultural heritage as well as natural heritage with emphasis on science.

- Automated information fund of scientific and research, research and design operations as well as defense of theses of the Ukrainian Institute of Information of Scientific Technology and Economy
- Aerodynamic complex based on subsonic wind tunnel TAD-2 of the National Aviation University
- Archive of manuscript funds of the Shevchenko Institute of Literature
- Archival scientific funds of manuscripts and phonographs of the Rylsky Institute of Art, Folklore and Ethnic Studies
- Bank of cell lines of the Bogomoletz Institute of Physiology
- Bank of strains of microorganisms for veterinary medicine of the Institute of Veterinary Medicine
- New generation diffractometric complex of the Kurdyumov Institute of Metal Physics
- Documents of pedagogical and psychological as well as historic and cultural directions of 19th - 20th centuries (1850–1917) of the Sukhomlynsky State Pedagogic Research Library
- Research and test site for material processing by explosion, utilization of ammunition and missiles of the Engineering Research Center "Metaloobrobka vybukhom"
- Experimental complex for hydrodynamical research of the Institute of Hydromechanics
- Bank of cell lines from human and animal tissues of the Kavetsky Institute of Experimental Pathology, Oncology and Radiobiology
- Collections of floral and ornamental plants and monocultural gardens of the Hryshko National Botanical Garden
- Collection of tropical and subtropical plants of the Hryshko National Botanical Garden
- Treasures of ancient history of Ukraine collection of the Institute of Archaeology
- Collection of embryonic plasma of plants of flora in Ukraine and rest of the World of the Institute of Cell Biology and Genetic Engineering
- Collection of microorganisms of the Zabolotny Institute of Microbiology and Virology
- Collection of old prints of the Ukrainian Pedagogic Museum
- Collection of valuable strains samples of winter wheat and corn - varieties, populations, and cell lines of unique mutant, recombinant and inbred of the Institute of Plant Physiology and Genetics
- Collection of strains of pathogens of tularemia, anthrax, listeriosis, erysipeloid, pseudotuberculosis, diphtheria, brucellosis of the Central sanitary epidemiological station
- Collection of strains of microorganisms and cell lines of plants for food and agricultural biotechnology (Institute of Food Biotechnology and Genomics)
- Collection of strains of pathogenic microorganisms for animals of the National Center for Microorganism Strains (Department of Agrarian Policy)
- Complex of test stands for research of strength of materials and elements of designs in extreme conditions of thermopower loading of the Pysarenko Institute of Strength Problems
- Laser satellite rangefinders: "Kyiv-Holosiiv" of the Main Astronomical Observatory
- Museum of pathogenic microorganisms for humans of the Hromashevsky Institute of Epidemiology and Infectious Diseases
- Scientific zoological stock collections of the Schmalhausen Institute of Zoology
- Scientific funds and museum exposition of the National Museum of Natural Sciences
- Science and research complex of integrated, holographic and fiber optics of the Spetsprylad (Kyiv Arsenal Factory)
- Science and research complex of scanning tunnel and scanning electron microscopy for nanostructured studies of the Institute of Magnetism
- National reference base of the State Committee for Standardization, Metrology and Certification
- National dictionary database of the Ukrainian Language and Information Fund
- National Herbarium of Ukraine (collection of plants) and collection of agaricomycotina (capped mushrooms) culture of the Kholodny Institute of Botany
- Complete and untouched fund of all types of released publications the State Archive printed by the Fedorov Book Chamber of Ukraine
- Firefight proving grounds of the Ukrainian Science and Research Institute of Fire Safety
- Publications fund that were published in the 19th century on agricultural topics of the National Agricultural Scientific Library
- Fund of manuscripts, old prints, rare publications, historical collections, Ukrainian archive fund and depository of the Vernadsky National Library of Ukraine
- Nuclear-physical installations: research nuclear reactor with "hot chambers", isochronous cyclotron "U-240" of the Institute for Nuclear Research Science Center

== List of the UNESCO World Heritage Sites ==
- Kyiv: Saint-Sophia Cathedral and Related Monastic Buildings, Kyiv Pechersk Lavra (permanent inscription)
- Kyiv: Saint Sophia Cathedral with Related Monastic Buildings, St. Cyril's and St. Andrew's Churches, Kyiv-Pechersk Lavra (extension of Kyiv: Saint-Sophia Cathedral and Related Monastic Buildings, Kyiv-Pechersk Lavra; tentative list)

== See also ==
- Monuments of national significance in Kyiv
- History of Kyiv
- Landmarks in Kyiv
