= Danylo Lyder =

Ukrainian theatre director (1917–2002)

Daniil Lider (1917-2002)

Danylo Danylovych Lyder (8 May [O.S. 25 April] 1917 – 29 December 2002, Kyiv, Ukraine) was a Ukrainian set designer, and teacher. He was a member of the National Academy of Arts of Ukraine, the National Union of Artists of Ukraine, the National Union of Theater Actors of Ukraine, and Taras Shevchenko National Prize Committee of Ukraine.

== Life ==
In 1933 he studied at the Rostov Art School, and after in 1937 he entered the Leningrad Academy of Arts . As an ethnic German was deported to the Chelyabinsk Oblast, where he worked as a miner, then as an artist in "Emanzhilinskugol". In 1946 he was the chief artist of the Chelyabinsk Drama Theater. In 1956, he graduated from the St. Petersburg State Academic Institute of Painting, Sculpture and Architecture.

He was artist at Kyiv National Academic Theatre of Operetta, and Ivan Franko National Academic Drama Theater. He taught at the National Academy of Visual Arts and Architecture. He organized over 150 performances.

He began his own scenography school. His students include A. Aleksandrovych-Dochevskyi, V. Karashevskyi, M. Levitska, Sergey Masloboyshchikov, I. Nesmyanov, and O. Lunyov.

He is buried at Baikove Cemetery.
