= List of cemeteries in Kyiv =

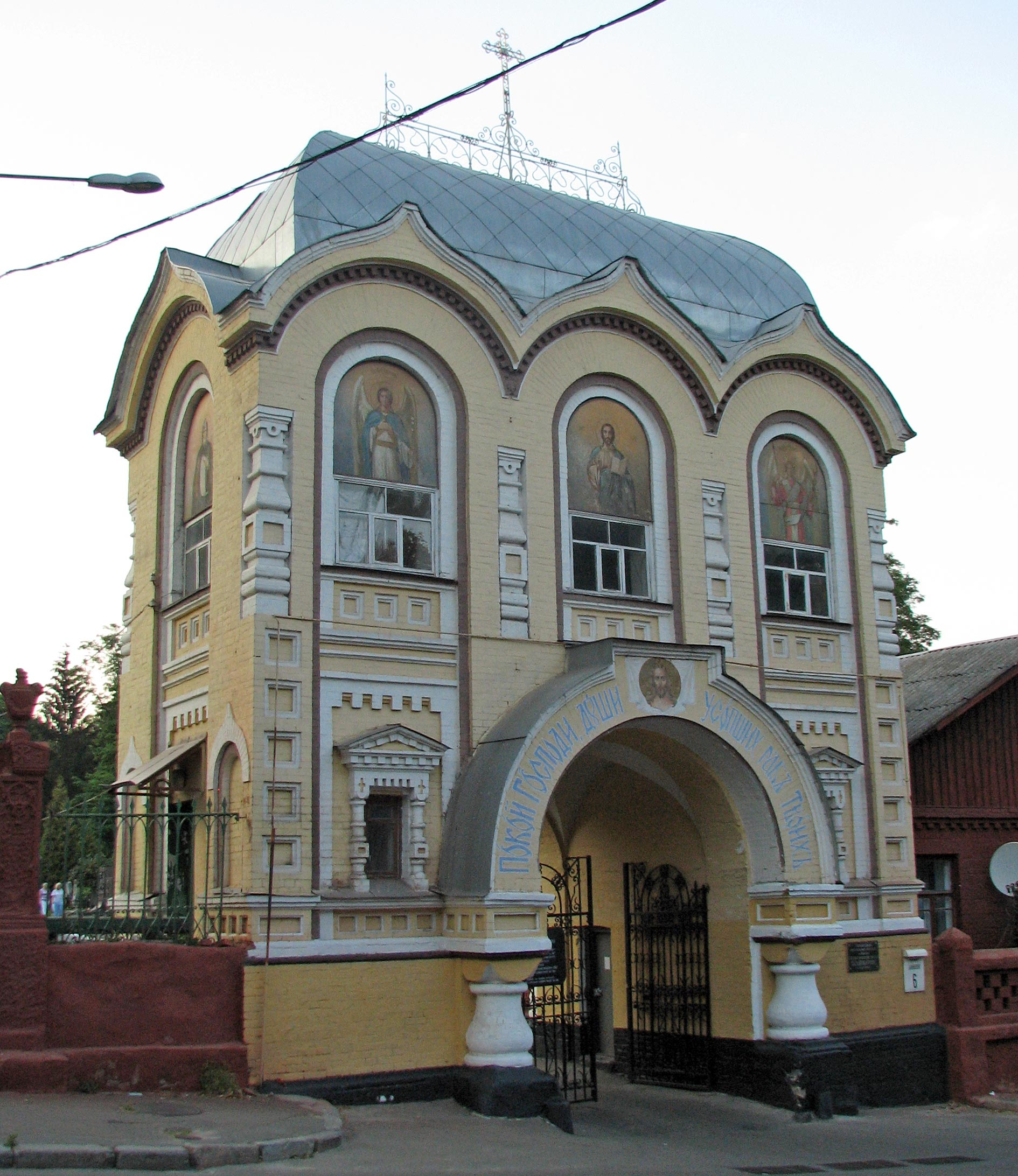
Main entrance at Baikove Cemetery

From long ago, noble residents of Kyiv were buried in monasteries, cathedrals, churches and their churchyards: the Church of the Tithes, St. Sophia's Cathedral, St. Michael's Golden-Domed Monastery, Vydubychi Monastery, Church of the Saviour at Berestove, St. Cyril's Monastery, Brotherhood Monastery, Florivsky Convent, etc. The places of burials were the Kyiv-Pechersk Lavra (Kyiv Monastery of the Caves), its Near and Far Caves, its Holy Dormition Cathedral.

The first mention of cemeteries for mass burials in Kyiv dates back to the end of the 17th century. The plague epidemic of the 1770s was the reason for the creation of the first city cemeteries: Podil (Shchekavytsia, City) (on Shchekavytsia hill, liquidated in the 1930s) and Kudriavets (Old City) (in the estate of the Ascension Church, liquidated in the 1930s). In 1786, the cemetery at the Askold's Grave was turned into a city cemetery (from the second half of the 19th century, it became a burial place for the privileged part of the population of Kyiv, liquidated in 1935). In addition, the remains of the cemetery on Zamkova Hora (Castle Hill) and the Old Believers cemetery on Lukyanivska Street have been preserved. Burials also existed in the cemeteries of the city's parish churches, most of which have not preserved.

In 2023 there were plans in establishing of the National Military Cemetery in Kyiv. Later in August 2023, those plans were changed. In November of the same year, mayor of Kyiv announced that he will insist on establishing of such memorial on the territory of the Kyiv city.

The article provides a list of current and former cemeteries where city residents are buried or were buried, and places of mass and individual burials.

== Existing cemeteries ==
Name	District/Address	Coordinates	Remarks	Image
Baikove Cemetery	Baikova Street, 6 Holosiivskyi District	50°24′59″N 30°30′40″E	One of the oldest cemeteries in the city, burials here began in 1834. The area is 72.47 ha (179.1 acres).	
Cemetery at Berkovets	Stetsenka Street, 18; Podilskyi District	50°29′40″N 30°23′42″E	Cemetery on the outskirts of Kyiv in the Berkovets area also known as the City Cemetery. It was opened in 1957, semi-closed, burials are allowed.	
Bilychi Cemetery	Akademika Bulakhovskoho Street; Sviatoshynskyi District	50°28′14″N 30°20′43″E		
Bortnychi Cemetery	Zaplavna Street; Darnytskyi District	50°22′6″N 30°41′53″E		
Bratske Cemetery	Hryhorovych-Barskoho Street, 2a Sviatoshynskyi District	50°24′33″N 30°23′43″E	It originated as a rural cemetery of the former village Bratska Borshchahivka. Closed for new burials, with the exception of burials of relatives. The area is 2.2 ha (5.4 acres).	
Bykivnia Cemetery	Bobrynetska street, 11; Desnianskyi District	50°28′23″N 30°39′41″E		
Chapayevske Cemetery	Liutneva Street, 1a Holosiivskyi District	50°20′6″N 30°33′39″E	Also Vita-Lytovska Cemetery	
Darnytsia Cemetery	Kharkivske Highway (Chausse), 52; Darnytskyi District	50°25′33″N 30°38′6″E		
Korchuvatske Cemetery	Yahidna Street, 24; Holosiivskyi District	50°22′6″N 30°31′22″E		
Kurenivka Cemetery	Valkivska Street, 19; Podilskyi District	50°29′34″N 30°26′53″E		
Lisove Cemetery	Krainia Street, 3 Desnianskyi District	50°29′58″N 30°38′1″E	The largest necropolis of the left bank part of Kyiv. Opened in 1970. The area is 142 ha (350 acres).	
Lukyanivske Cemetery	Dorohozhytska Street, 7 Shevchenkivskyi District	50°28′4″N 30°27′12″E	One of the oldest cemeteries of the city located near Babyn Yar. Since 1994 it is a State historical and memorial park.	
Lukianivka Viyskove Cemetery	Dorohozhytska Street, 8 Shevchenkivskyi District	50°28′16″N 30°27′22″E	Lukianivka Military Cemetery, a necropolis for military personnel in Lukianivka.	
Mykhailivske Cemetery	Myru Street, 36; Sviatoshynskyi District	50°24′22″N 30°25′20″E	Mykhailivska Borshchahivka village cemetery	
Mysholovka Cemetery	Yahidna Street, 27; Holosiivskyi District	50°22′11″N 30°31′12″E		
Old Believers Cemetery	Lukianivska Street, 48; Shevchenkivskyi District	50°27′53″N 30°29′51″E		
Pozniaky Cemetery	Teplovozna Street, 2 Darnytskyi District	50°25′38″N 30°38′3″E		
Pushcha-Vodytsia Cemetery	Selianska Street, 14; Obolonskyi District	50°33′19″N 30°20′18″E		
Pyrohivske Cemetery	Laureatska Street, 36; Holosiivskyi District	50°20′59″N 30°31′29″E	Cemetery of residents of the former village of Pyrohiv. The area is 5 ha (12 acres)	
Shuliavka Cemetery	Zakhidna Street, 9 Solomianskyi District	50°26′40″N 30°26′5″E	The cemetery was opened in 1885. Its original boundaries are not known. During the Soviet regime in 1932, a street was laid in the middle of the cemetery, and at the same time, the cemetery's chapel was demolished. The cemetery was closed for burials in 1950. In 2002, the cemetery was encircled with a concrete wall.	
Sovske Cemetery	Koloskova Street, 6 Solomianskyi District	50°24′27″N 30°28′26″E		
Solomianske Cemetery	Mytropolyta Vasylia Lypkivskoho Street, 119; Solomianskyi District	50°25′42″N 30°28′16″E	It was established in the 1870s in place of the Old Solomianske (Pankivske) cemetery located in the Lybid river valley	
Sviatoshynske Cemetery	Velyka Okruzhna Street, 79; Sviatoshynskyi District	50°26′55″N 30°21′35″E		
Troyeshchyna Cemetery	Sadova Street, 2 Desnianskyi District	50°31′10″N 30°35′10″E		
Vyhurivshchyna Cemetery	Oleksiya Kurinnoho Street, 4 Desnianskyi District	50°30′24″N 30°34′38″E		
Cemetery at Zhuliany	Povitroflotska Street, 24a Solomianskyi District	50°23′52″N 30°26′26″E		
Cemetery at Zvirynets	Verkhnia Street, 21; Pecherskyi District	50°25′29″N 30°33′17″E	A small cemetery located at Zvirynets, on a hill between Navodnytskyi Yar (Navodnytskyi Ravine) and Mykoly Mikhnovskoho Boulevard. The area is 5.6 ha (14 acres) (of which 3.3 ha (8.2 acres) are free from burials). Currently, the cemetery is semi-closed (burying is done only in reserve places).	

== Former cemeteries ==
Name	Remarks
Askold's Grave	The necropolis arose at the end of the 18th century and was considered one of the most prestigious in Kyiv. In 1919, the cemetery was closed, and in 1934 it was destroyed.
Old Bratske Cemetery	A small cemetery that arose in 1916 at Zvirynets, for the burial of soldiers who died of wounds or died in the battles of the World War I. It was destroyed in the 1950s.
Demiivka Cemetery	The Demiivka village cemetery, which is known since the 19th century was liquidated in the 1950s. Now there is a residential building on this place.
Dekhtiari Cemetery	The cemetery near the khutir of Dekhtyari. It was known since the 19th century and was closed in 1947, finally destroyed in 1975. Now there is a residential area on this place.
Jewish Cemetery at Zvirynets	The old Jewish cemetery, founded in 1796, closed for burials at the end of the 19th century, liquidated in the 1920s. Now this is the territory of the Hryshko National Botanical Garden.
Karaim Cemetery at Zvirynets	Formed in the 19th century. Now this is the territory of the Hryshko National Botanical Garden.
Muslim Cemetery at Zvirynets	A small cemetery established at Zvirynets at the end of the 19th century for the burial of Turkish prisoners of the 1877–1878 Russo-Turkish War (Russian retribution war for the Crimean War). Now this is the territory of the Hryshko National Botanical Garden.
Karaim Cemetery in Lukianivka	In its location was built the Avanhard sports complex in 1960s
Muslim Cemetery at Lukianivka	In its location was built the Avanhard sports complex in 1960s
Yordanske Cemetery	It was formed in the 17th and 18th centuries at the Convent of St Nicholas of Jordan, liquidated in 1808. After the liquidation of the monastery, its church became a parish church, and accordingly, the cemetery was transformed from a monastic one into one belonging to the city, for the burial of residents of Tatarka, Yurkovytsia and the surrounding areas. The temple and bell tower were dismantled in 1935 during the Soviet regime. Since then, the cemetery was also closed and began to fall into disrepair. The remains of the cemetery, surrounded by a fence, were preserved on the slopes of Yurkovytsia to the north of the group of buildings No. 26, 26-a, 26-b on O. Schmidt Street. The cemetery is saved from final destruction by the topography of the area, which makes this site unattractive for builders.
Kyrylivske Cemetery	One of the ancient Kyiv cemeteries. Its appearance is associated with the liquidation of the St. Cyril's Monastery in 1784 by Catherine the Great. While the monastery was active (12th-18th centuries), monks and prominent people were buried in the temple or around it. With the appearance of an almshouse and later a hospital within the monastery walls, there was a need for a place for burials. He was taken away by the city authorities on the southern slopes of Kyrylivka Hill, outside the former monastery. In 1871, at the request of the hospital's administration, the city authorities gave permission to expand its territory. As of 1929, when the cemetery was closed and ceased to be guarded, its area was 9.7 ha (24 acres).
Kopylivske Cemetery	It was located at the end of the modern Oleny Telihy Street, opposite the St. Cyril's Monastery. It has been known since the 19th century, was destroyed by pulp during the Kurenivka mudslide in 1961 and was finally liquidated in the following years.
Mykilska Slobidka Cemetery	It was a cemetery of the St. Nicholas Monastery Sloboda on the left bank of Dnieper. It was known since the 19th century and destroyed in the 1970s.
Mostytske Cemetery	It was located within the modern Mostytsky masyv neighborhood. It was known since the 19th century. It was gradually destroyed since the 1970s, finally liquidated in 1986 for the construction of a new housing estate and a highway. However, several gravestones have been preserved.
Tatarske Cemetery	It is also known as Musulmanske (Muslim). It has been active since the beginning of the 20th century. It is closed, not registered. Since the mid-1990s, a spiritual center for the city's Muslims has been created on the territory of the cemetery and the surrounding area. It is located on Lukianivska Street.
Pokrovsky Nunnery Cemetery	It was founded in 1890 at the Pokrovsky Nunnery. Many famous people were buried here. It was destroyed in the 1950s.
Pokrovske Cemetery at Solomianka	A small cemetery near the Intercession Church in Solomyanka. Destroyed in Soviet times, several tombstones have been preserved.
Florivske Cemetery	A cemetery on Zamkova Hora, which was created in 1816 for the residents of Podil, Honchary and Kozhumyaky. It belong to the Ascension Convent located in the Kyiv's Podil.
Shchekavytske Cemetery	It was created in 1772 to bury victims of the plague in the 1770s, destroyed in the 1930s.

== Special necropoles or burial sites ==
Name	Location	Coordinates	Remarks	Image
Bykivnia graves	Bykivnia; Dniprovskyi District	50°28′18″N 30°41′48″E	In the 1930s and early 1940s (before the German occupation of Kyiv), mass burials of repressed persons were carried out in a secret setting near the village of Bykivnia and executed in Kyiv by the NKVD authorities. Officially, the construction of a special zone for secret burials began in 1936. According to scientists, about 100,000-120,000 repressed people were buried in Bykivnia.	
Mariinskyi Park	Mariinskyi Park; Pecherskyi District	50°26′48″N 30°32′18″E	Mariinskyi Park was used by the Soviet regime for mass burials in 1917–1918. By the end of 1930s most of burials were transferred away, but few still remain.	
Eternal Glory Memorial	Park of Eternal Glory; Pecherskyi District	50°26′20.8″N 30°33′11.45″E	It consists of an obelisk and the Alley of Fallen Heroes, where are 34 graves of soldiers who died during World War II. It was opened on November 6, 1957.	
Vydubychi Monastery graveyard	Vydubychi Monastery; Pecherskyi District	50°25′00″N 30°34′05″E	A few burials from the once numerous cemetery that have survived	
Kyiv Pechersk Lavra graveyard	Kyiv Pechersk Lavra; Pecherskyi District	50°26′2″N 30°33′31″E	Many prominent people are buried on the territory of the Lavra, in particular, near the refectory - the judge general of the Ukrainian Cossack Host Vasily Kochubey and the Poltava colonel Ivan Iskra, in the Church of the Saviour at Berestove Prince Yuri Dolgorukiy.	
Kytaiv Hermitage graveyard	Kytaiv Monastery; Holosiivskyi District	50°22′1″N 30°32′32″E	Burial of monks, the grave of schema-archimandrite Theophilus and cenotaph Saint Theophilus.	
Mass grave at the Pyrohoshcha Church graveyard	Pyrohoshcha Church; Podilskyi District	50°27′48″N 30°30′59″E	There was a small cemetery near the old Pyrohoshcha Church. When the temple was destroyed, the burials were also destroyed. In 1998, during the reconstruction of the church, all the remains found were buried in a mass grave near the church.	
German Cemetery on Ryzka Street	Syrets; Shevchenkivskyi District	50°28′30″N 30°25′56″E	German prisoners of war who died in the Syrets concentration camp are buried	
Florivsky Monastery graveyard	Ascension Convent; Podilskyi District	50°27′47″N 30°30′49″E	Convent hegumen Eupraxia, the Kyiv governor Major General Semen Sukin, the episcope Feodor (Vlasov) are buried	
Holosiiv Hermitage graveyard	Holosiiv Monastery; Holosiivskyi District	50°22′43″N 30°30′40″E	It appeared in the early 2000s. There are buried crime boss Kysil, Naval Major General Volodymyr Khrustytskyi (monastic name — Varlaam), others	

== Individual burials ==
Name	District/Address	Coordinates	Image
Petro Konashevych-Sahaidachny	Brotherhood Monastery	50°27′53″N 30°31′12″E	
Mykola Malyushytskyi	University of Life and Environmental Sciences	50°23′2.5″N 30°29′48.9″E	
Aleksandr Bogomolets; Oleksandr Bohomolets	Memorial Park of Academician Bohomolets	50°26′25″N 30°31′44″E	
Volodymyr (Romaniuk)	Sophia Square	50°27′10.8″N 30°30′55.4″E	
