= Mykhailo Lysenko =

Soviet painter (1906–1972)

Mikhail Grigoryevich Lysenko
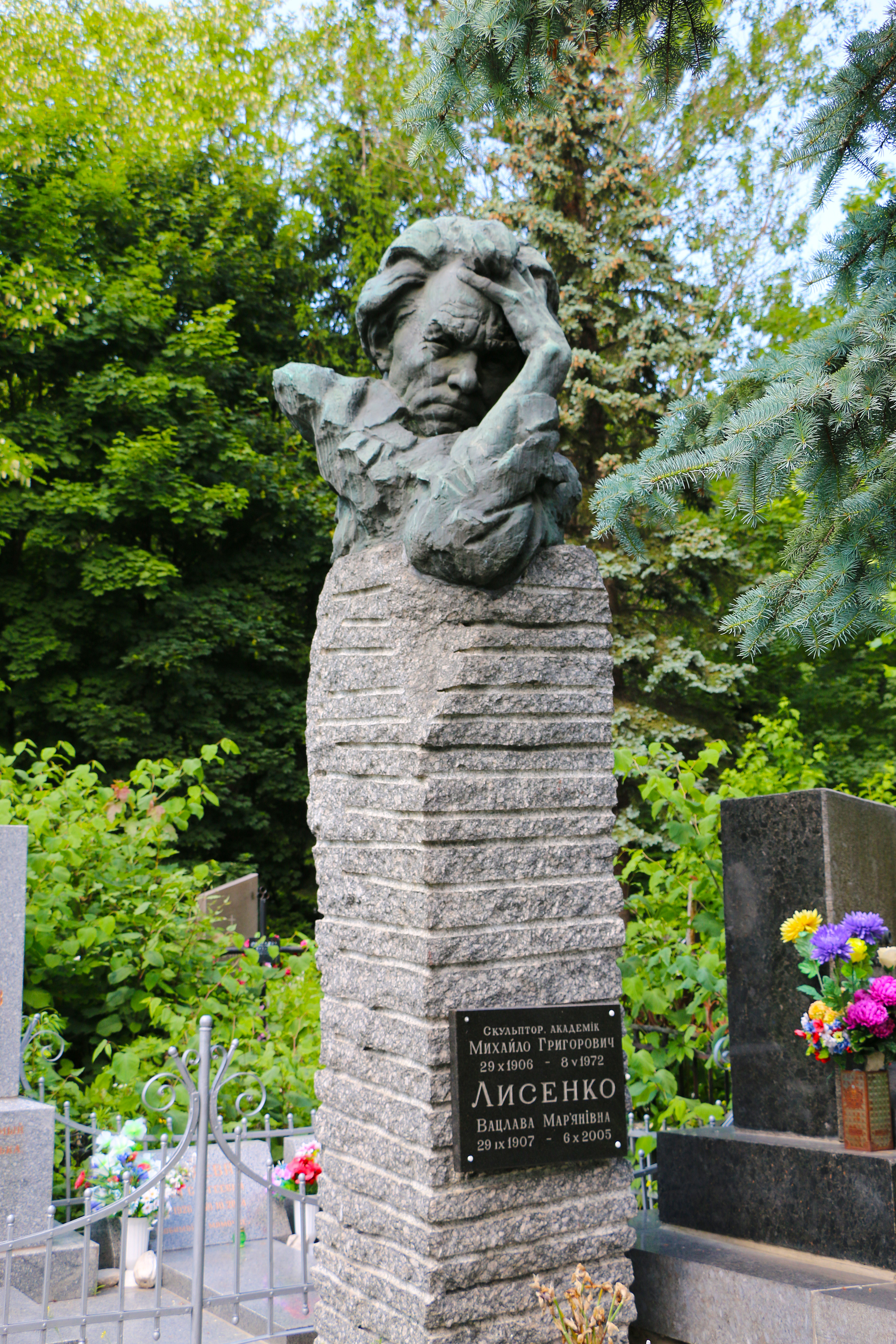
- Bust of Mikhail Grigoryevich Lysenko in Kyiv, Ukraine
- Born: 1906; Shpilevpa, Sumy Oblast, Soviet Union
- Died: 1972 (aged 65–66); Kyiv, Soviet Union
- Known for: Sculpture

For the Ukrainian composer, see Mykola Lysenko.

Mikhail Grigoryevich Lysenko, also known as Mykhailo Lysenko (1906-1972), was a Soviet sculptor, and a People's Artist of the USSR.
