= Anatoli Zhelezniakov =

Russian anarchist and revolutionary (1895–1919)

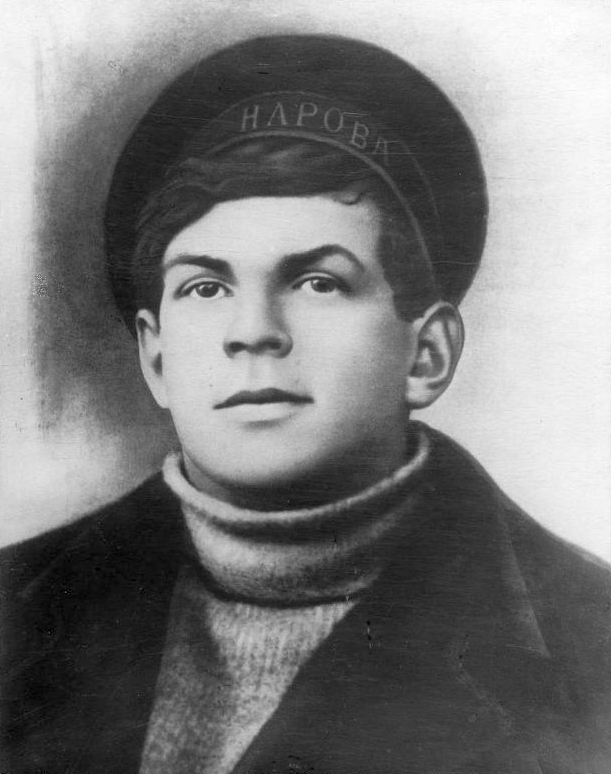
- Died: July 26, 1919 (aged 24); Ekaterinoslav, Russia
- Other names: Sailor Zheleznyak (Russian: Матрос Железняк, romanized: Matros Zheleznyak)
- Known for: Ending the Russian Constituent Assembly in the October Revolution

Anatoli Grigorievich Zhelezniakov (1895–1919) was a Russian anarchist and revolutionary best known for dispersing the short-lived Russian Constituent Assembly on Bolshevik orders during the October Revolution.

== Biography ==
During the fall of the tsarist government in the 1917 February Revolution, Anatoli Grigorievich Zhelezniakov served on a minelayer in Kronstadt, near Petrograd. For several months following the revolution, anarchists and other revolutionaries turned the Dacha Durnovo, a private villa in Petrograd, into a commune. In June, following an attempt by its occupants to occupy a local newspaper printing-press, the Russian Provisional Government ordered the Dacha Durnovo occupants to leave. In response, Zhelezniakov and 49 other sailor–revolutionaries joined the Durnovo occupants to defend against the eviction. After two weeks and another occupant attack to liberate a prison, the government ordered a raid on the Durnovo villa, which killed one anarchist. Zhelezniakov was imprisoned in the Preobrazhensky Regiment barracks and sentenced to 14 years of hard labor, but within weeks of the 1917 July Days, Zhelezniakov escaped from the Kresty Prison on 6 September 1917.

Zhelezniakov, as a follower of Kropotkin (1842-1921) and Bakunin (1814-1876), organized Kronstadt sailors to demonstrate at the American embassy to protest results of the San Francisco Preparedness Day Bombing trial: both Tom Mooney's death sentence and the potential extradition of Alexander Berkman.

Though he was the minelayer crew's delegate to the Second Congress of Soviets in October 1917, he instead attended the assault on the Winter Palace with a crew of sailors, as part of the October Revolution. Zhelezniakov cooperated with the Bolshevik overthrow of the Russian Provisional Government and subsequently commanded the Tauride Palace guard. On Bolshevik orders, Zhelezniakov disbanded the Russian Constituent Assembly, telling the assembly on January 5, 1918: "The guard is tired." Anarchists were known opponents of both parliamentary assembly and of this specific configuration.

During the Russian Civil War, Zhelezniakov led a Red Army flotilla and an armored train. He participated in engagements against Alexey Kaledin (Don Cossacks), Pyotr Krasnov, and Anton Denikin. Zhelezniakov opposed Trotsky's Red Army reorganization (which abolished self-organization and put tsarist officers in charge) as a regressive. He was subsequently outlawed by the Bolsheviks, along with the anarchist Black Guards and the Makhno Black Army. Zhelezniakov absconded to Moscow, where the chairman of the All-Russian Central Executive Committee attempted to reconcile what he considered a misunderstanding by offering Zhelezniakov a high-ranking military role, which Zhelezniakov turned down. He went to Odessa to continue to fight the White Army, but the Bolsheviks tried to recruit him again in 1919. He accepted and commanded an armored train. Denikin put a contract on Zhelezniakov. He was killed by Denikin's artillery outside Ekaterinoslav on July 26, 1919, at the age of 24.

== Legacy ==
The Soviets, who outlawed and ostracized Zhelezniakov during his life, lauded him as a hero posthumously. Speeches in Moscow accompanied his burial. The Bolsheviks later built a statue in Kronstadt to honor Zhelezniakov's role in the October Revolution. Multiple songs and poems have been penned in his honor, though his remembrance is limited to his role as a revolutionary and martyr, without mention of his anarchist affiliation. Despite Soviet claims, Zhelezniakov never joined the Bolshevik party and remained an anarchist till his death.

== See also ==
- Soviet destroyer Zheleznyakov, for which Zhelezniakov was the namesake
- Soviet monitor Zhelezniakov

== Bibliography ==
- Avrich, Paul (1988). "Stormy Petrel: Anatoli Zhelezniakov". Anarchist Portraits. Princeton, New Jersey: Princeton University Press. pp. 107–110. ISBN 0-691-04753-7. OCLC 17727270.
