= Mikhail Vaschenko-Zakharchenko =

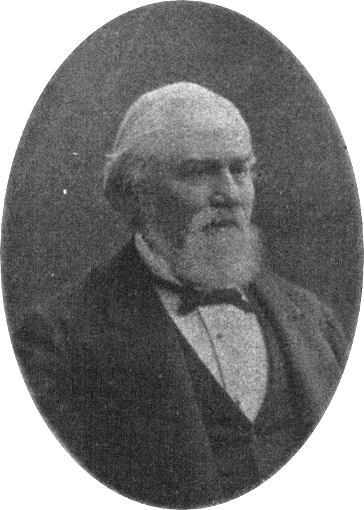
- Born: November 12, 1825
- Died: August 27, 1912
- Spouse: Vera Nikolayevna Vaschenko-Zakharchenko

Mikhail Yegorovich Vaschenko-Zakharchenko (Russian: Михаи́л Его́рович Ва́щенко-Заха́рченко, Ukrainian: Миха́йло Єго́рович Ва́щенко-Заха́рченко) (October 31 (old style) (November 12) 1825 in Malievka, Zolotonosha uyezd, Poltava Governorate, Russian Empire – August 14 (old style) (August 27) 1912 in Kiev, Russian Empire, (present-day Kyiv, Ukraine)) was a Russian mathematician, member of Moscow Mathematical Society from 1866 and Privy Councillor of Russia from 1908. His major areas of research included the history of geometry in antiquity and Lobachevskian geometry.

Mikhail Vaschenko-Zakharchenko was married on Vera Nikolayevna Vaschenko-Zakharchenko (née Mel'nickaya), the founder of the First Private Kiev Gymnasium for women.

== Biography ==
Vaschenko-Zakharchenko was born in noble family of Ukrainian descent. He studied in Zolotonosha uyezd college and the 2nd Kiev Gymnasium. His mathematical education he received partially in the Kiev University, partially in Paris.

Since 1867 — a professor of the Kiev University. From the start of 1870s Vaschenko-Zakharchenko began to read the course of the projection geometry, and from 1878 — the course of non-Euclidean geometry (basics of the Lobachevsky geometry). In 1880 he published the translation of Beginnings of Euclid with a big introduction where were viewed the main principles of the hyperbolic geometry.

In 1871, Mikhail Vaschenko-Zakharchenko married Vera Nikolayevna Mel'nickaya (1840—1895) from Tver noble family. Vera Vaschenko-Zakharchenko has founded in Kiev the first private Gymnasium for women.

== Scientific works ==
In 1862, for the first time systematically gave a lecture on the operational calculation and applied it to solve the differential equations.

In 1866, he defended his doctor dissertation Riemann's theory of compound variable functions. That was one of the first works in the Imperial Russia in that field.

Vaschenko-Zakharchenko is also known for working in the history of mathematics.

He is an author of more than dozen textbooks on the analytical geometry, projection geometry, algebra, calculus of variations, and including an important work on the history of mathematics in which he discussed the history of mathematics up to the 15th century.

He worked on the theories of linear differential equations, probability and non-Euclidean geometry.

== The list of his works ==
- Конические сечения и новейшие алгебраические и геометрические методы для исследования свойств кривых линий. Соч. Г. Салмона. — Санкт-Петербург, 1860.
- Of fractional differentiation // Quarterly Journal of pure and applied Mathematics, 1861, Vol. IV.
- Символическое исчисление и приложение его к интегрированию линейных дифференциальных уравнений. — Киев, 1862.
- Кратные точки и касательные алгебраических кривых // Вестник математических наук, т. I.
- Риманова теория функций составного переменного. — Киев, 1866.
- Признаки наибольшего и наименьшего значения функций // Математический сборник, 1868, т. III.
- Лекции разностного исчисления, читанные в универ. св. Владимира. — Киев, 1868.
- Теория определителей и теория форм. Лекции, читанные в универ. св. Владимира. — Киев, 1877.
- Начала Эвклида с пояснительным введением и толкованиями. — Киев, 1880.
- Список „Начал“ Эвклида, вышедших с 1482 г. по 1880 г. — Киев, 1880.
- Указатель сочинений по неэвклидовой геометрии по 1880 г. — Киев, 1880.
- Исторический очерк математической литературы халдеев. — Киев, 1881.
- Исторический очерк математической литературы индусов. — Киев, 1882.
- Характер развития математических наук у различных народов древнего и нового мира до XV века. — Киев, 1882.
- Considération sur le développement des mathématiques depuis les temps les plus reculés jusqu'au XV siècle // Mémoires de la Soc. des Sciences phys. et natur. de Bordeaux", т. V (2 Sér.)
- Элементарная геометрия в объеме гимназического курса. — Киев, 1883.
- История математики. Том первый. — Киев, 1883.
- Краткий курс теории определителей. — Киев, 1883.
- Аналитическая геометрия двух измерений. — Киев, 1883.
- Аналитическая геометрия трех измерений. — Киев, 1883.
- Алгебраический анализ. — Киев, 1883.
- Исторический очерк развития аналитической геометрии. — Киев, 1884.
- Аналитическая геометрия двух и трех измерений. Издание второе, дополненное и исправленное. — Киев, 1884.
- Алгебраический анализ. Издание второе, дополненное и исправленное. — Киев, 1884.
- Вариационное исчисление в объеме университетского курса. — Киев—Санкт-Петербург, 1890.
- Высшая алгебра: теория подстановлений и прил. её к алгебраич. уравнениям. — Киев—Санкт-Петербург, 1890.
- Проективная геометрия. — Киев, 1897.
- Опыт изложения дифференциального и интегрального исчисления без помощи бесконечно-малых и пределов. — Киев, 1907.
