= Soviet monitor Zhelezniakov =

Naval river monitor (1936–1960)

Coordinates: 50°28′26″N 30°31′32″E

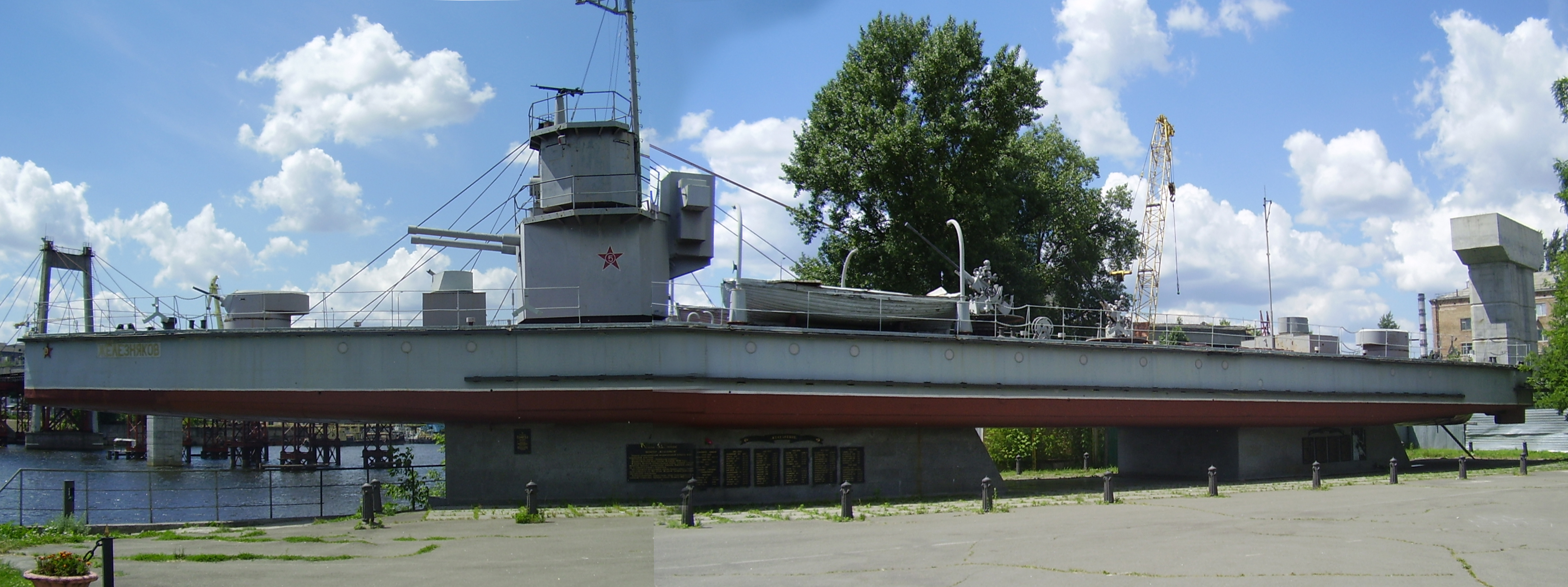

History

Soviet Union
- Name: Zhelezniakov
- Namesake: Anatoli Zhelezniakov
- Laid down: 25 November 1934
- Launched: 22 November 1935
- Commissioned: 27 October 1936
- Decommissioned: 10 September 1960
- Renamed: PSKL-4, 18 March 1958
- Reclassified: Hulk, 11 March 1958
- Fate: Transferred to the Soviet Danube Shipping Company after 10 September 1960; Converted to a floating jetty
- Status: Memorial ship since 10 July 1967

General characteristics
- Type: River monitor
- Tonnage: 263 t (259 long tons; 290 short tons)
- Length: 51.2 m (168 ft)
- Beam: 8.2 m (26 ft 11 in)
- Draft: 0.90 m (2 ft 11 in)
- Propulsion: 2 × 140-metric-horsepower (138 hp) diesel engines; 2 × shafts
- Speed: 8.3 kn (15 km/h; 10 mph)
- Endurance: 3,700 nmi (6,900 km; 4,300 mi)
- Crew: 72
- Armament: 1 × twin 102 mm (4 in)/45 cal. MK-2-4 gun turret; 2 × 45 mm 40-K gun turrets (each with 1 × coaxial 7.62 mm DT machine gun) then 1 × 45 mm 40-K gun turret (with 1 × coaxial 7.62 mm DT machine gun) and 1 × twin 45 mm 41-K gun turret (from 1941); 2 × 7.62 mm machine gun turrets; 1 × 7.62 mm AA machine gun then 1 × quadruple 7.62 mm M-4 AA machine gun mount (from 1941), later 2 × 37 mm 70-K AA guns and 2 × 12.7 mm DShK machine guns (during the Great Patriotic War)
- Armor: Belt: 16 mm (0.63 in) and 4 mm (0.16 in) at the ship's ends; Main deck: 4 mm (0.16 in); Main gun turret and CT tops: 16 mm (0.63 in); Main gun turret and CT sides: 30 mm (1.2 in)

Zhelezniakov (Russian: Железняков) was a river monitor of the Soviet Navy and the class leader of her six-ship class (Soviet designation Project SB-37). Completed during the 1930s it participated in World War II and was the only one of its class that survived the war.

The ship was named after the Russian sailor Anatoli Zhelezniakov who was famous for being among those who dispersed the Russian Constituent Assembly in 1918 and his saying "The guard has grown weary".

In 1967 it was installed in the Sailor's Park at Rybalskyi Island as a memorial ship. The same year around the memorial ship was created the Sailor's Park (official name "To the sailor's of the Dnieper Flotilla"). The ship was a monument of science and technology, history with a protected number 260062-N until its removal from the State Register of Immovable Monuments in 2023.
