= Kuialnyk Cemetery =

Historic cemetery in Odesa, Ukraine

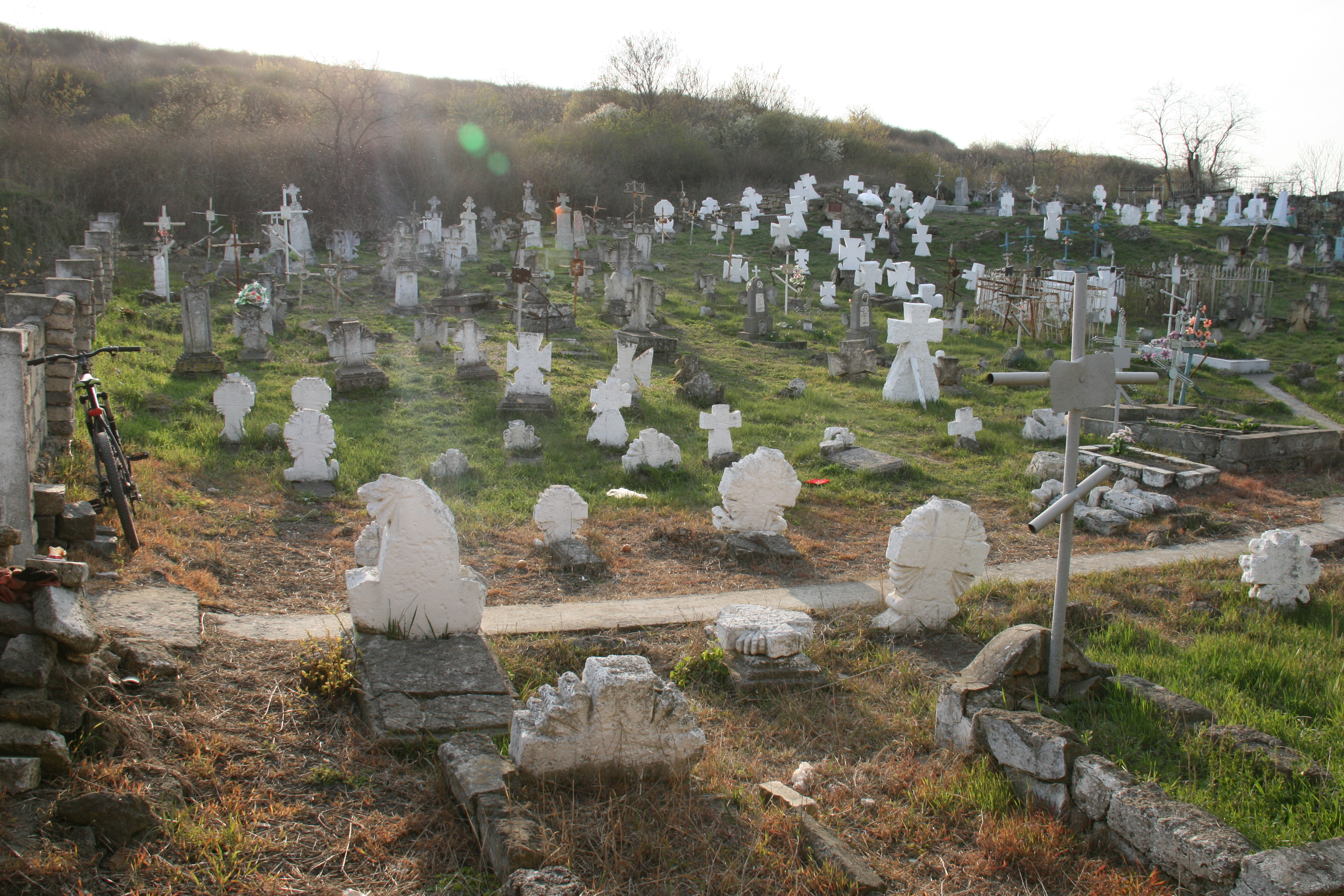

Details
- Established: around 1775
- Closed: 1965
- Location: Kuialnyk, Odesa
- Country: Ukraine
- Coordinates: 46°31′11″N 30°41′22″E
- Type: Orthodox
- Size: 0.16 ha (0.40 acres)
- No. of graves: At least 531

Immovable Monument of Local Significance of Ukraine
- Official name: Куяльницьке кладовище (Kuialnyk Cemetery)
- Type: History
- Reference no.: 1600-Од

Kuialnyk Cemetery (Ukrainian: Куяльницький цвинтар), also known as Sotnykivska Sich (Ukrainian: Сотниківська січ), is a historic cemetery in Kuialnyk neighborhood, Odesa, Ukraine. It is the largest Cossack cemetery in Ukraine.

== History ==
After the destruction of the Zaporozhian Sich, a lot of Cossacks moved to Turkish-controlled territory. Some of them settled in surroundings of Hacıbey fortress, near the Kuialnyk-Khadzhybei bar. Since the narrow bar was constantly flooded, the Cossacks settled near Shkodova and Dovha Mohyla hills. The village of Kuialnyk was established on the slopes of Shkodova Hill, and the Ascension Church was founded there in 1809. But, the cemetery appeared even earlier, approximately in 1775, with the oldest burial dating to 1791, three years before Odesa was founded. Parish registers from the Ascension Church were kept from 1809 to 1822. Later, the Church of the Nativity of Virgin Mary was founded in the neighboring village of Usatove, and since its establishment the parish register was kept there. Overall, the registers contain data on 531 burials. Two-thirds of the last names are of Ukrainian origin, including 18 names of namesakes or direct descendants of Zaporozhian regimental officers, as well as of hetmans (Doroshenko, Chornyi) and general osavuls (Lysenko), and last names derived from kurins.

Kuialnyk Cemetery covers an area of 0.16 ha, with the last burial in 1965. The cemetery includes about 205 tombstones carved from solid limestone blocks, with inscriptions on 33 of the crosses. All inscriptions are in mixed Church Slavonic and Ruthenian and start with the phrase "здесь почивае раб Божій" ("here rests the servant of God"), followed by the name and surname, as well as cryptonyms such as ІН ЦЙ (Jesus of Nazareth, King of Judea). The oldest tombstone has the inscription "Здсъ погрєбнъ рабъ Божи младенцъ Иоанъ року Божія 1771" ("Here lies the servant of God, the child Ioan, of the God's year 1771"), but experts date this grave to year 1791.

== Structure ==
Four-pointed crosses predominate among the tombstones, while six-pointed and eight-pointed crosses are less common. In most of the tombstones, the base is wider than the top. The widened bases have triangular, trapezoidal, or rounded rectangular shapes. Greek and extended crosses are very common, sometimes supplemented with a crescent in the base. Maltese crosses are also common, sometimes in combination with a crescent as well. Round and three-leaved crosses are the rarest. Radiant forms are common, consisting of segments forming a circle, the sign of the Sun which represents God in Old Slavic symbolism.

== Preservation ==
On 4 April 2017, the Ukrainian Institute of National Memory supported the initiative of local activists about giving the cemetery the status of a national landmark. In April of 2021, the Ministry of Culture included the Kuialnyk Cemetery in the State Register of Immovable Landmarks.

== Gallery ==
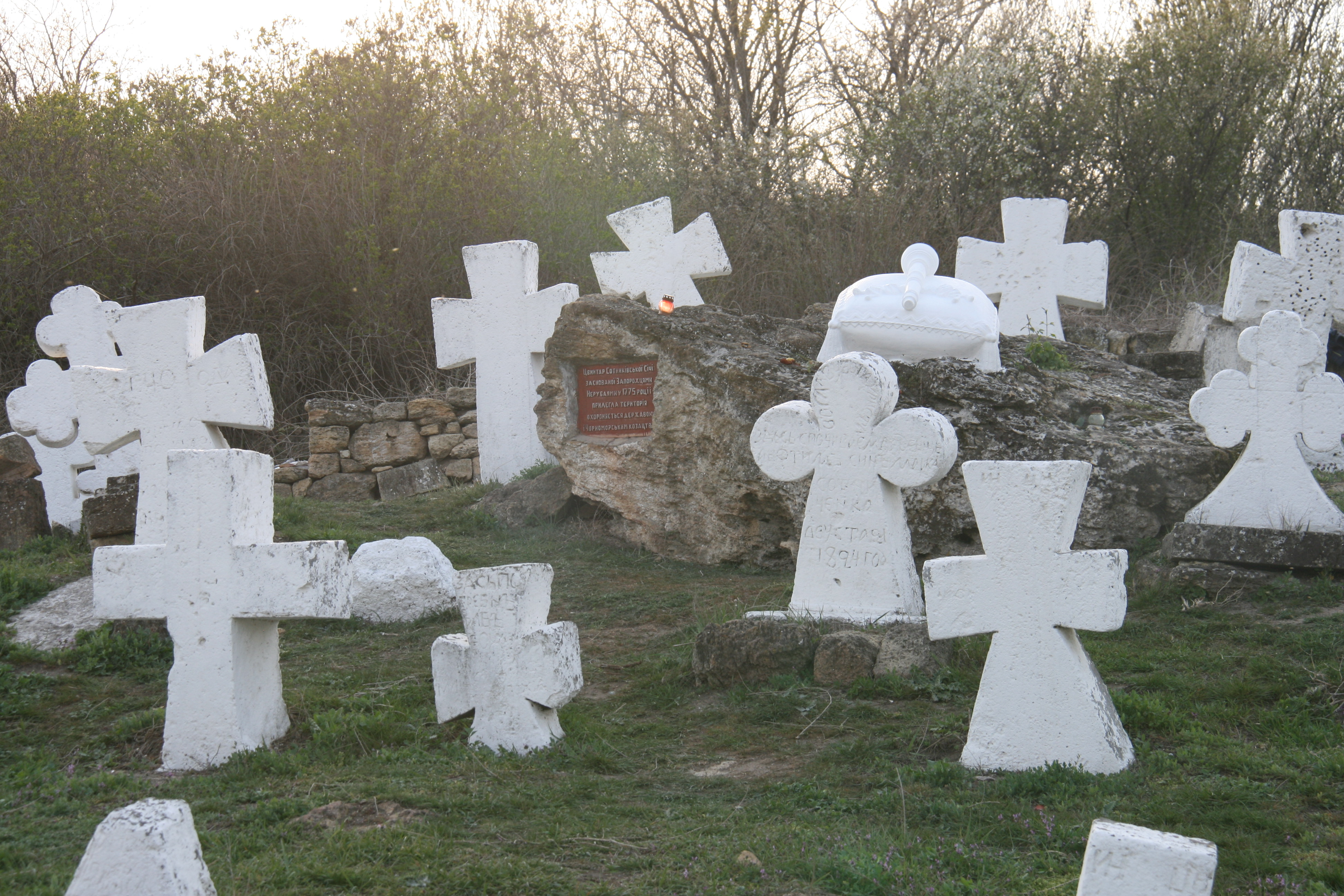
Central part

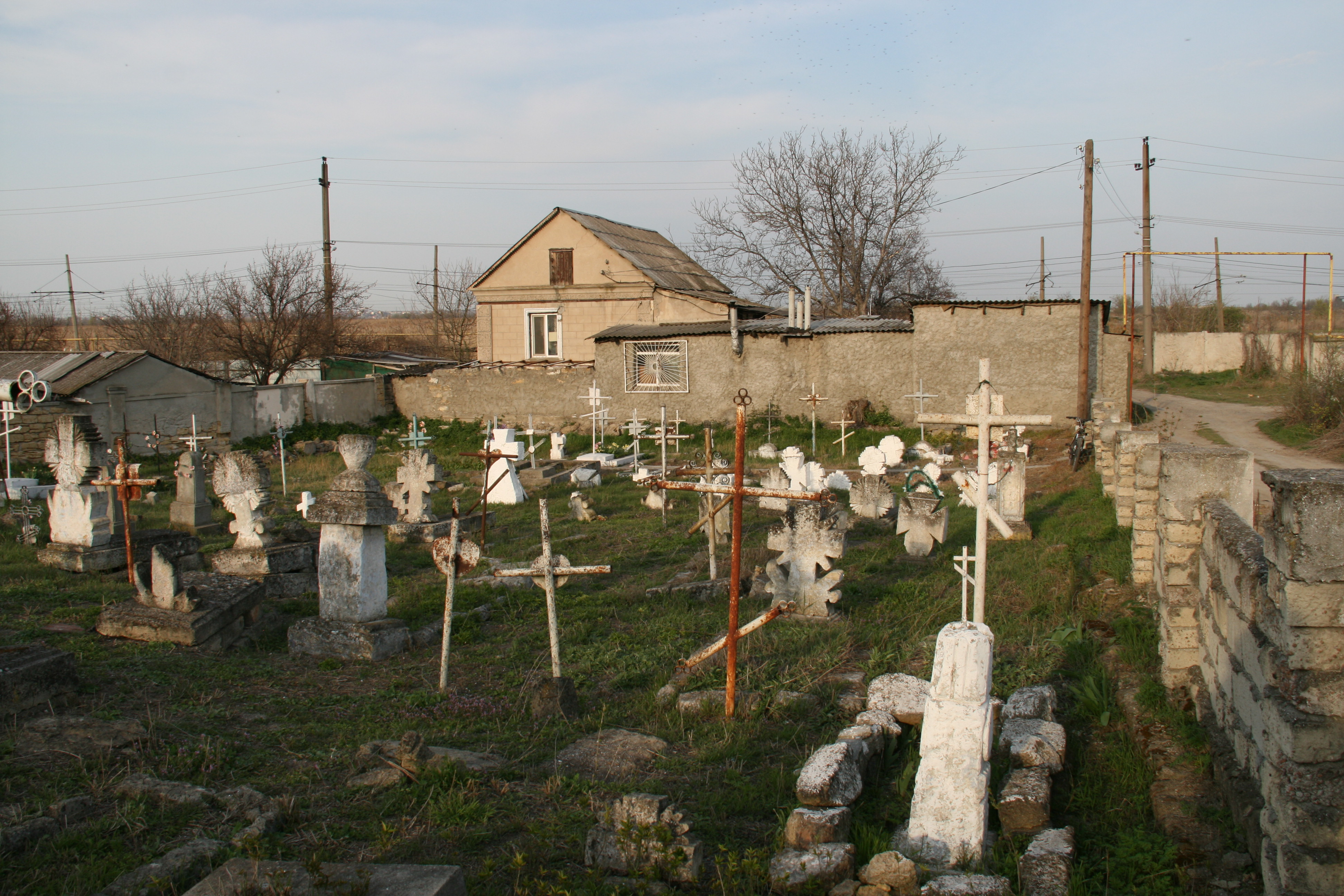
Southern part

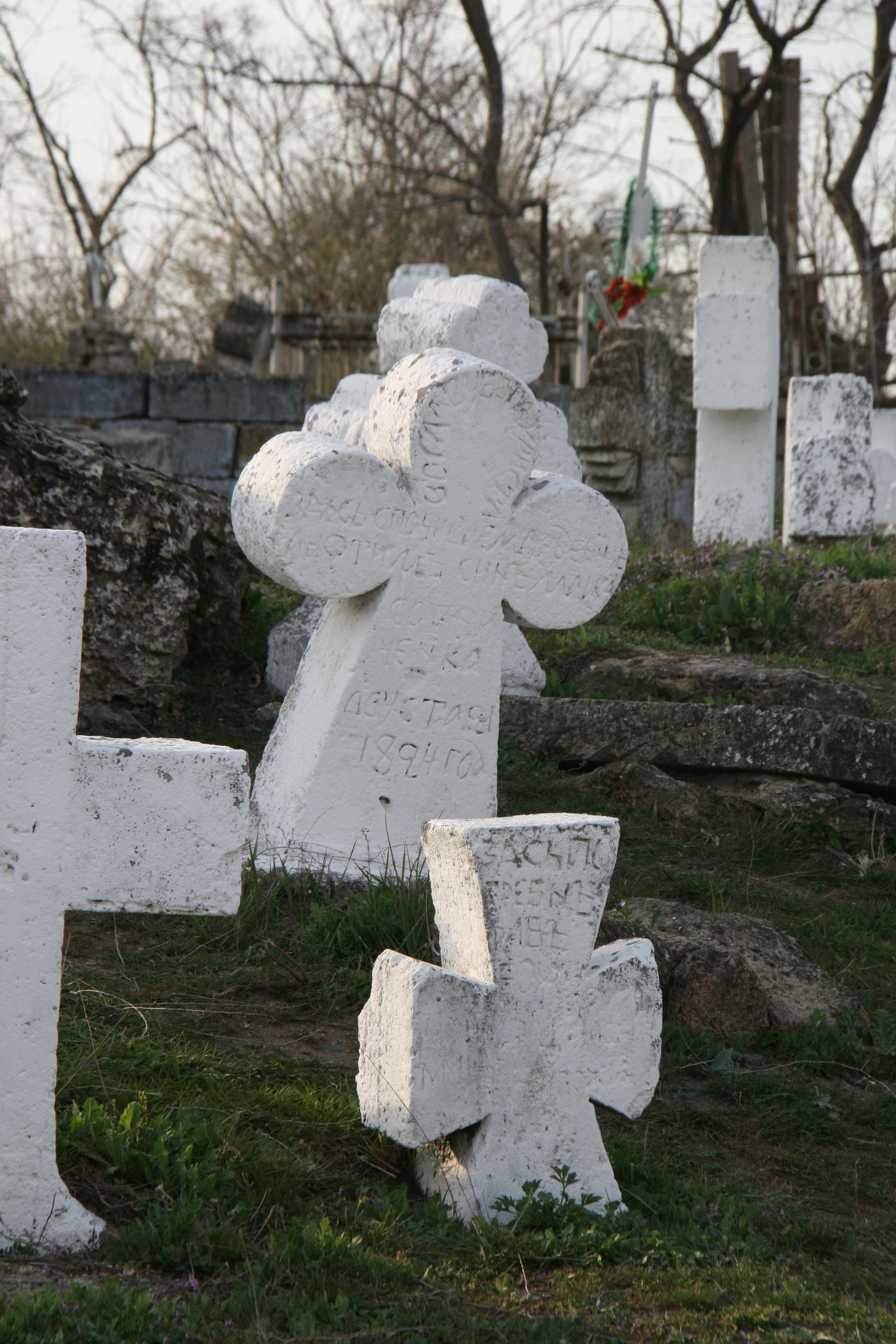
Oldest burial (small cross in foreground)

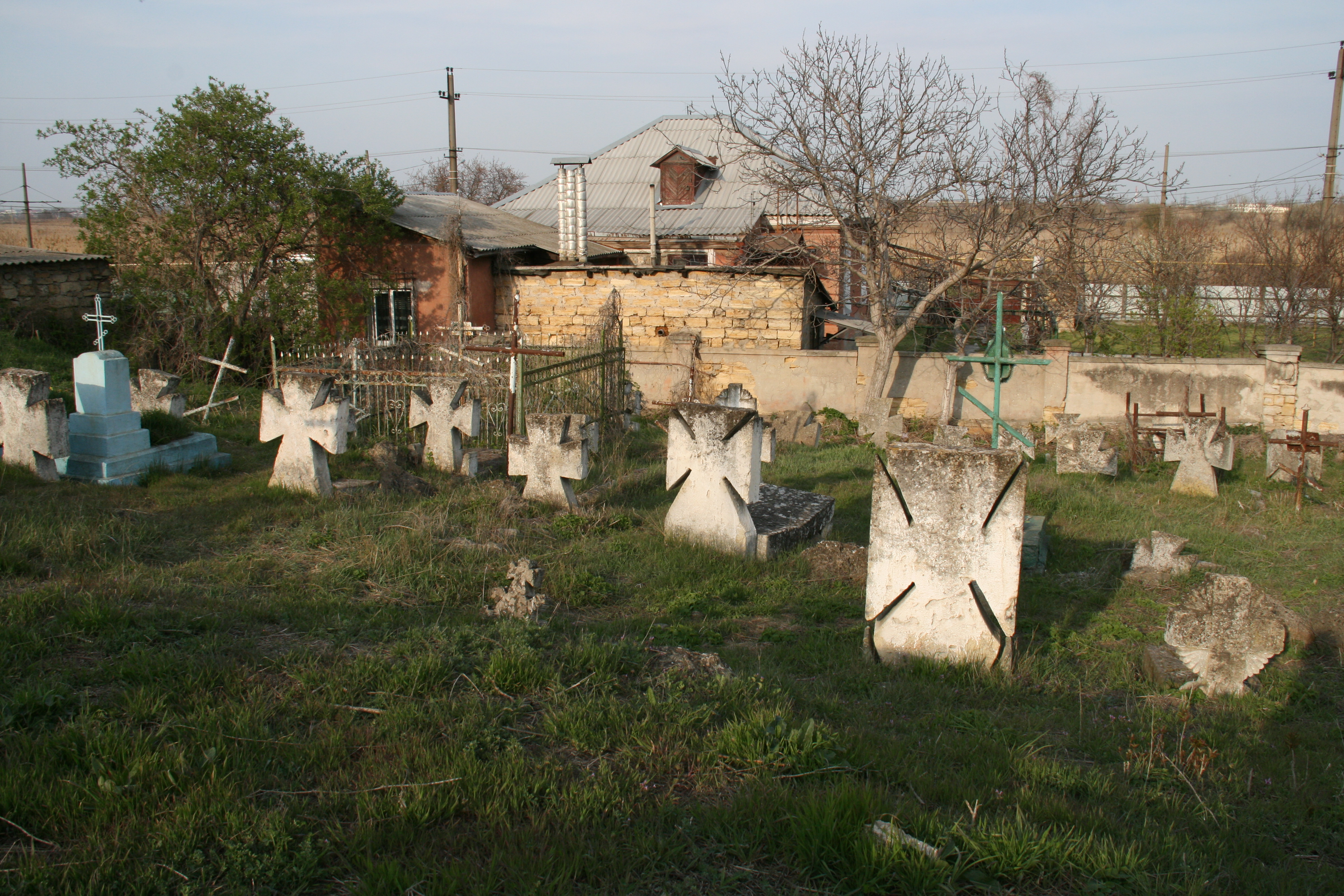
Maltese crosses

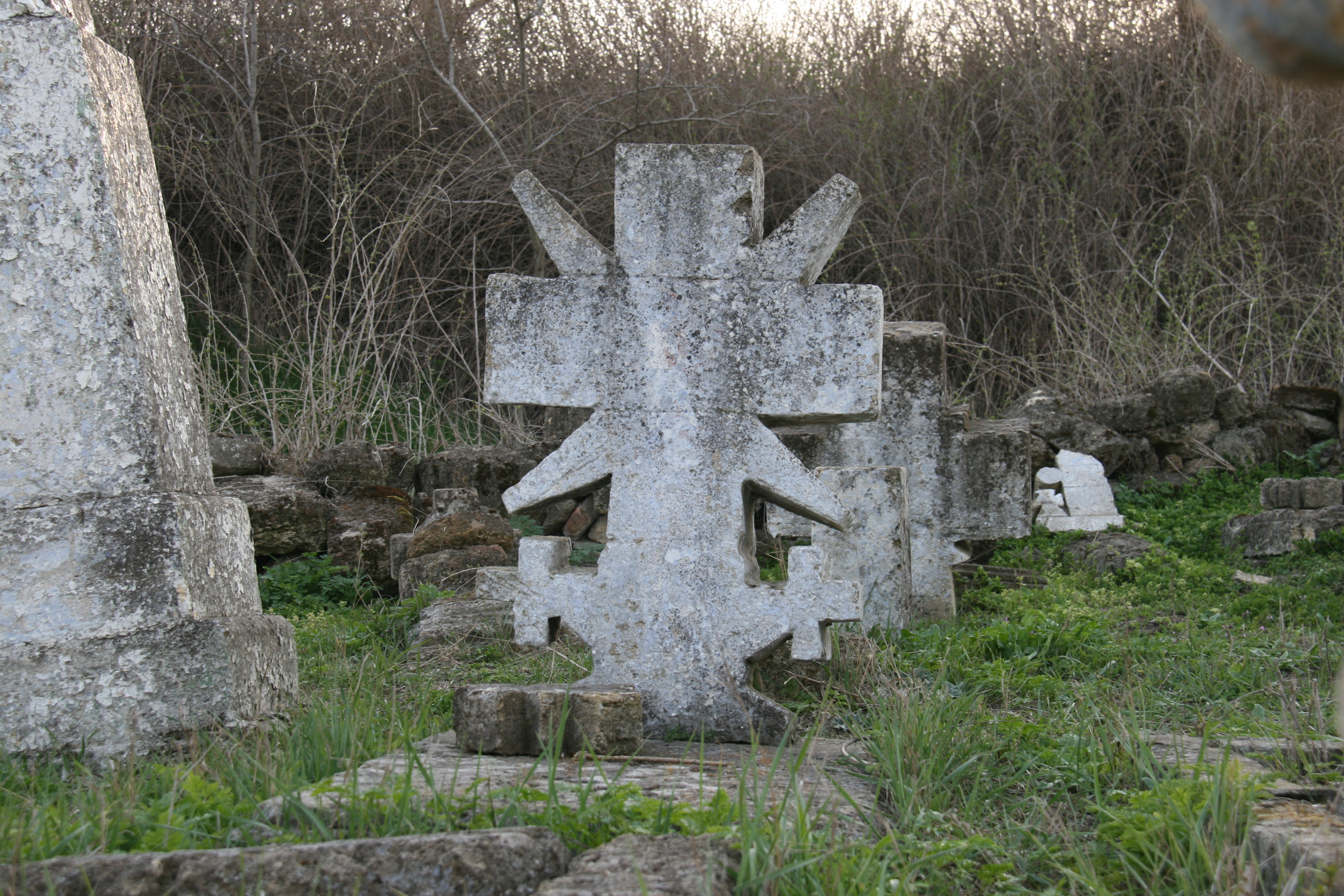
Cross with an anchor

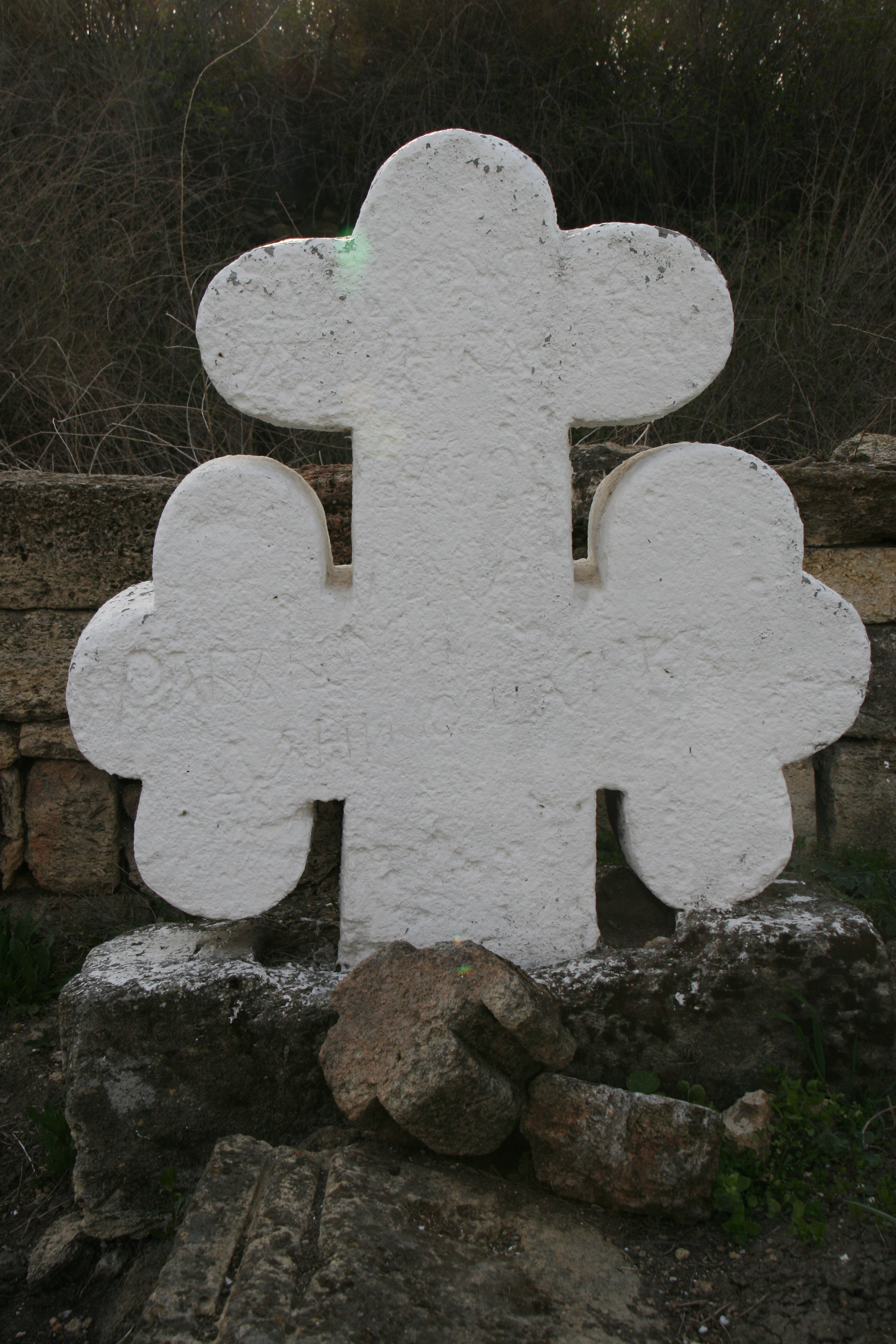
Three-leaved cross

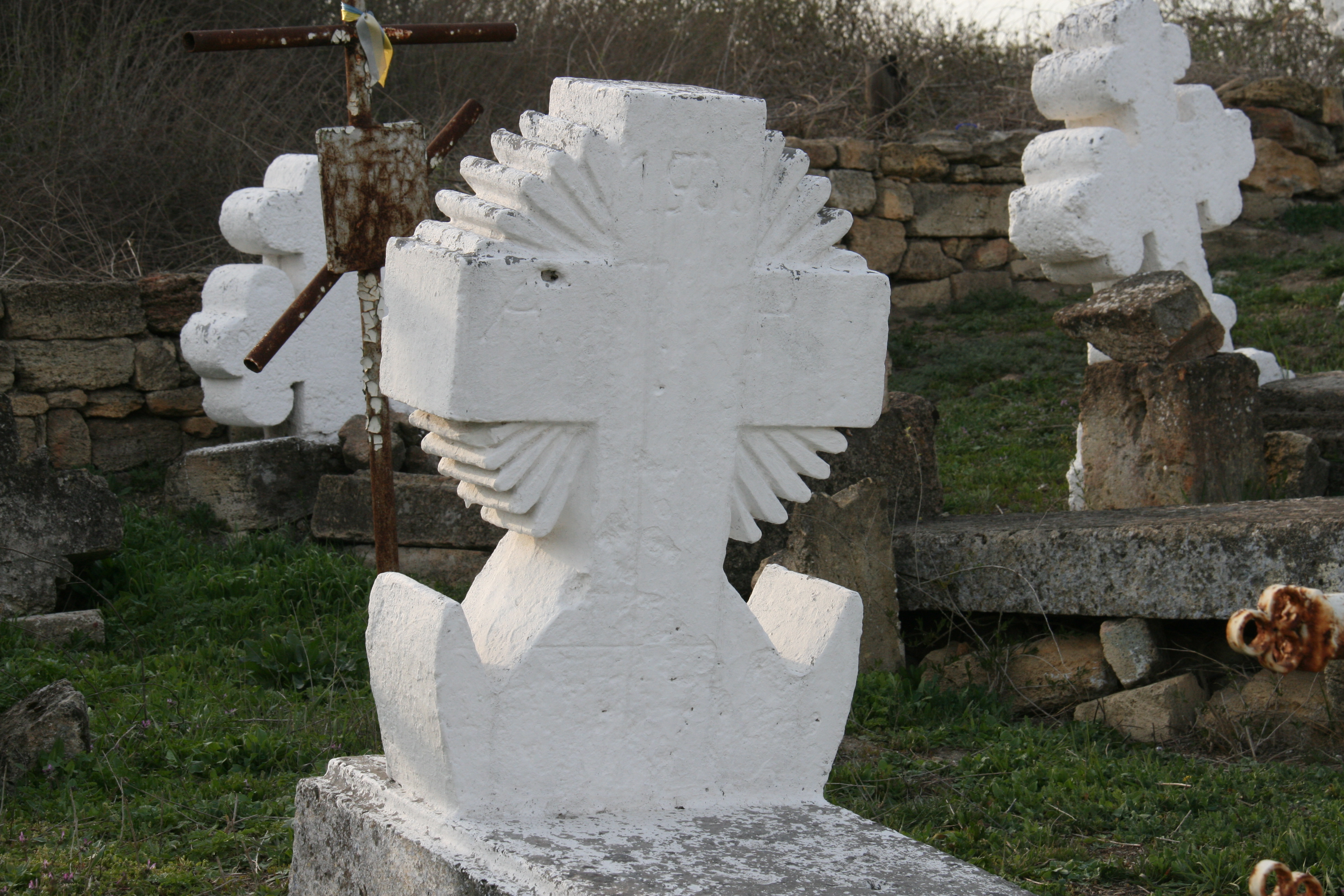
Radiant cross

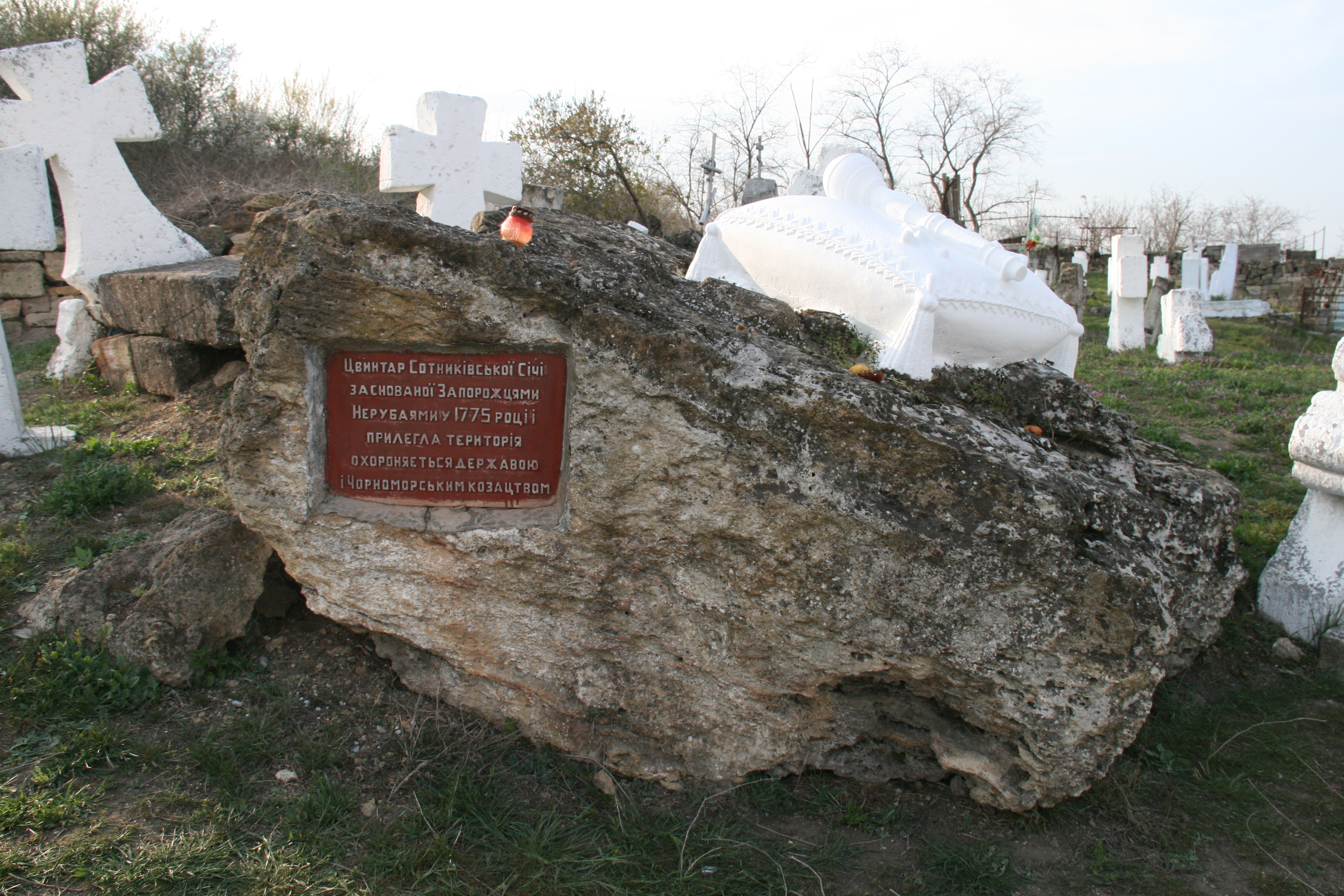
Memorial plaque

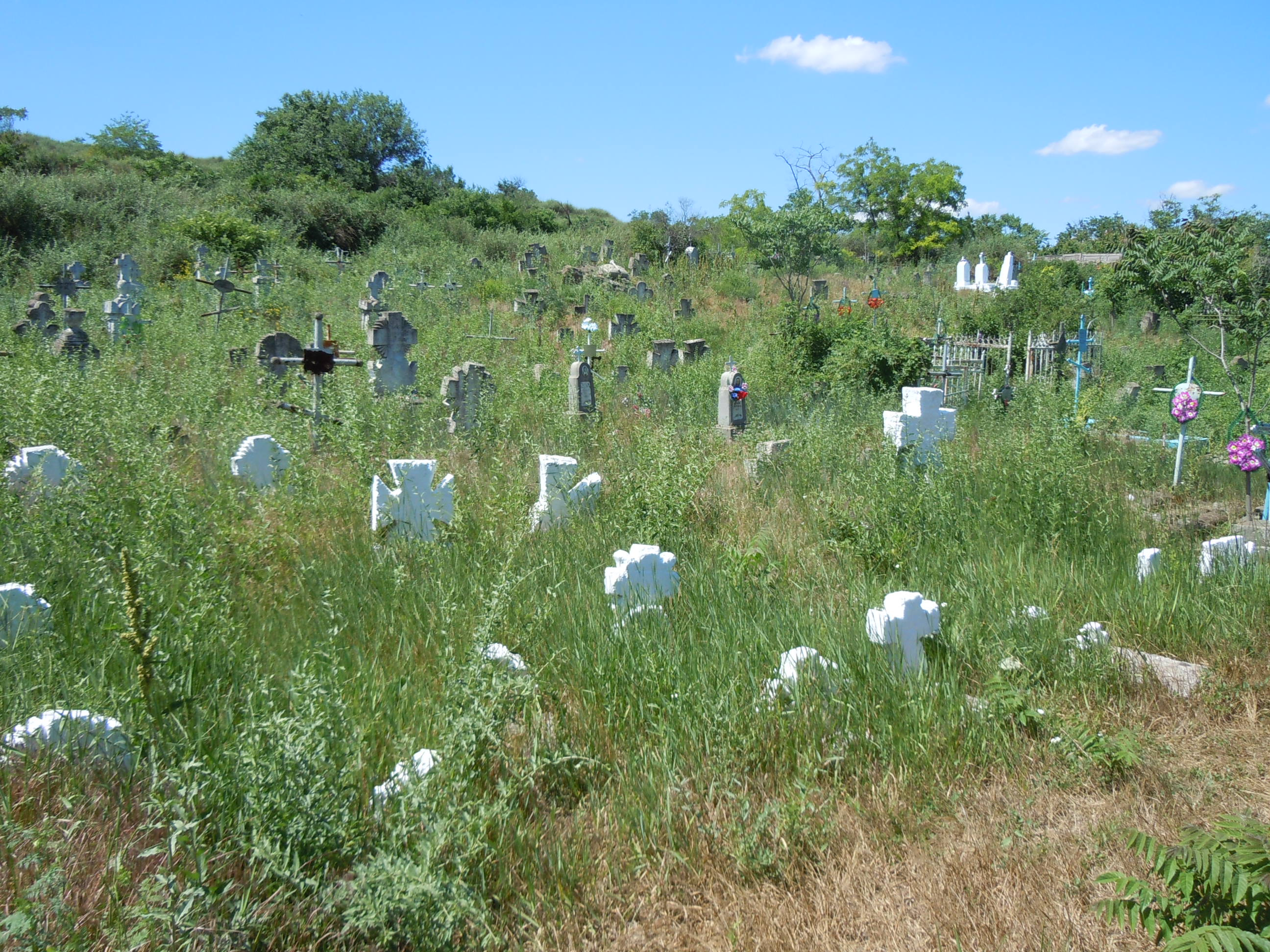
Cemetery in 2013 (before restoration)
