= City Park =

City Park can refer to:

- urban park, a park in the city

== Parks ==
- City Park, Kabul, Afghanistan
- City Park, Launceston, Tasmania, Australia
- Stadtpark, Vienna, Austria; aka City Park
- City Park (Budapest), Hungary
- City Park, City of Langley, Langley Township, British Columbia, Canada
- Assiniboine Park, Winnipeg, Manitoba, Canada; formerly named City Park
- City Park, Tehran, Iran
- City Park (Luxembourg City), Luxembourg; a park in central Luxembourg City
- City Park, Penang, Malaysia
- City Park, Zemun, Belgrade, Serbia
- City Park (Kyiv), Ukraine
- Eastside City Park, Birmingham, England, United Kingdom; a planned urban park
- City Park, Jaipur, Rajasthan, India

United States

- City Park (Dallas), Texas; a park
- City Park, Denver, Colorado; a park
- City Park (New Orleans), Louisiana; a park
- City Park, California, Missouri
- Commodore Barry Park, Fort Greene, Brooklyn, New York City, New York; formerly called City Park
- Washington Park (Portland, Oregon), originally named City Park in 1871

== Places ==
- City Park, Saskatoon, Manitoba, Canada; a neighbourhood

United States

- City Park, Benicia, California
- Balboa Park (San Diego), California; formerly called City Park
- City Park, Denver, Colorado; a neighborhood
- City Park, Houston, Texas
- City Park, New Orleans, Louisiana, a neighborhood

== Facilities ==
- Parque de la Ciudad, Villa Soldati, Buenos Aires, Argentina; a former amusement park; aka City Park
- City Park Ice Rink, Budapest, Hungary
- City Park (Delhi Metro), Delhi, India; a subway station
- City Park Hockey Stadium, Nairobi, Kenya; a field hockey pitch
- City Park Mall, Constanta, Romania; a shopping centre
- City Park, Edinburgh, Scotland, United Kingdom; a defunct soccer football ground

United States

- CityPark, a soccer stadium in St. Louis, Missouri, United States
- City Park Golf, Denver, Colorado, United States; a golf course
- City Park Golf Course, Baton Rouge, Louisiana, United States; a golf course
- City Park (Bradenton), Florida, United States; the original name of McKechnie Field baseball field
- City Park/Pepsi Tennis Center, New Orleans, Louisiana, United States
- City Park Race Track, New Orleans, Louisiana, United States; a horseracing track
- Tad Gormley Stadium, New Orleans, Louisiana, United States; a multipurpose stadium formerly called City Park Stadium
- City Park Stadium, New Rochelle, New York, United States; a soccer stadium
- City Park Brewery, Philadelphia, Pennsylvania, United States; a defunct brewery

== Other uses ==
- City Park (1934 film), an American comedy-drama film
- City Park (1951 film) (German: Stadtpark), an Austrian comedy-drama film
- City Parks Foundation, New York City, New York, United States; an independent non-profit concerned with the City of New York's parks
- City Park Radio, Launceston, Tasmania, Australia; a radio station

== See also ==
- City Park West, Denver, Colorado, United States; a neighborhood
- Royal National City Park of Sweden; a city park network
- Big City Park, Ormeau Park, Belfast, Northern Ireland, United Kingdom; a televised live puppet show on BBC
- City of Parks, Louisville, Kentucky, United States; an urban development plan
- Cities in the Park, Heaton Park, Manchester, England, UK; a music festival
- Kiel-Hassee CITTI-PARK station; the transit station "Citti-Park" in the Hasse district of Kiel in Germany
- Citti Park, several shopping centres in Germany, see List of shopping malls in Germany
- Park City (disambiguation)
