= Presentation Monastery, Kyiv =

Ukrainian Orthodox Monastery

Presentation Monastery
- Введенський монастир
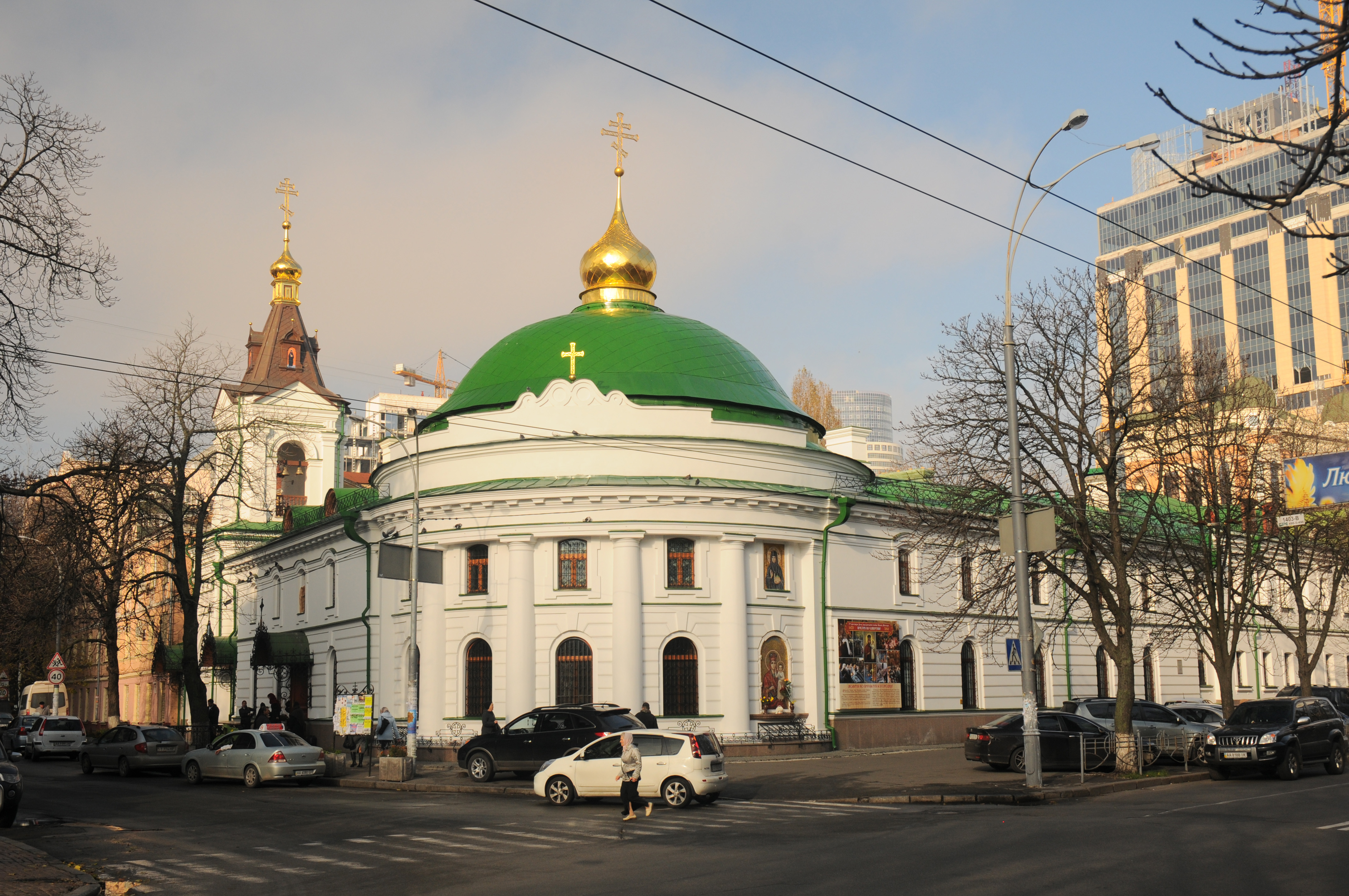
- Interactive map of Presentation Monastery

Monastery information
- Full name: Holy Presentation Monastery
- Established: Late 19th to early 20th centuries
- Diocese: Diocese of Kyiv

People
- Founder: Matrona Alexandrovna Egorova

Architecture
- Heritage designation

Immovable Monument of Local Significance of Ukraine
- Official name: Комплекс монастиря Введенської громади (Complex of the Monastery of the Presentation Community)
- Type: Architecture and Urban Planning
- Reference no.: 463-Кв

Site
- Country: Ukraine
- Coordinates: 50°26′02″N 30°32′40″E
- Website: vvedenskiy.kiev.ua

The Presentation Monastery (Ukrainian: Введенський монастир, romanized: Vvedenskyi monastyr), also known as the Holy Presentation (Sviato-Vvedenskyi) Monastery, is a men's monastery of the Ukrainian Orthodox Church located in the Pecherskyi District of Kyiv, Ukraine.

== History ==
=== Origin ===
The Monastery was founded thanks to the efforts of Matrona Alexandrovna Egorova. She lived in Kyiv since 1856, after her husband died during the Crimean War. In the 1870s, she received permission to create a women's community. To create the community, she bought houses in the Pechersk neighborhood, particularly on the Rybalskaya and Moskovskaya streets. In 1878, after she bought all the land in the area, the community was opened, and Matrona Alexandrovna Egorova became its abbess and took the Tonsure. After her death, the community received all her real estate and 21 thousand Rubles. Nun Euphalia became the next abbess. Historical sources show that between 1880 and 1890 the community carried out construction works with the help of donations, notably from Grand Duchess Alexandra Petrovna.

=== 20th Century ===
On April 30, 1901, the Decree of the Holy Synod was issued, transforming the community into the Holy Presentation Monastery. It was headed by Abbess Cleopatra. There was a bookstore at the church, and the parish school operated at the monastery until 1917, when it was transferred into the public city board. In 1930, the city of Kyiv decided to evict people from the monastery who are not related to labor categories. Due to this, 142 nuns were forced to leave the monastery, and it was closed until 1941. During the 1990s the monastery was headed by Archimandrite Damian. In 1992, the monastery Church was returned to the Ukrainian Orthodox Church, and soon services resumed. In 1996, the monastery became a men's monastery.
