= Stadsparken =

Stadsparken (Swedish for "City's park") may refer to:

- Stadsparken, Lund, a park in Lund, Sweden
- Stadsparken, Borås
- Stadsparken, Eskilstuna
- Stadsparken, Helsingborg
- Stadsparken, Hjo
- Stadsparken, Jönköping
- Stadsparken, Luleå
- Stadsparken, Oskarshamn
- Stadsparken, Skellefteå
- Stadsparken, Södertälje
- Stadsparken, Trelleborg
- Stadsparken, Uppsala
- Stadsparken, Västerås
- Stadsparken, Örebro

== See also ==
- City Park (disambiguation)
