= Park City =

Park City may refer to:

== Places ==
- National Park City, London, England, UK; see parks and open spaces in London

in the United States

- Park City, Illinois
- Park City, Kansas
- Park City, Kentucky
- Park City, Montana
- Park City, Tennessee
- Park City, Utah
- Park City Historic District, a residential historic district in Amasa, Michigan

== Facilities and structures ==
- Park City Center (Sofia), Bulgaria; a shopping centre

in the United States

- Park City Plaza, Bridgeport, Connecticut, USA; an office building
- Park City Center, Lancaster, Pennsylvania, USA; a shopping center
- Park City Hospital, Utah, USA; see List of hospitals in Utah
- Park City Branch, Salt Lake City, Utah, USA; a rail division
- Park City Mountain Resort, Park City, Utah, USA; a ski resort
- Park City High School, Park City, Utah, USA

== Other uses ==
- MV Park City, a ferry
- Park City (short story collection) by Ann Beattie
- Park City Daily News, Bowling Green, Kentucky, USA; a newspaper
- Park City Television, a cable channel based in Utah, USA
- MS Park City, a Microsoft software package developed at Lehi, Utah
- Park City Group, a software company based in Salt Lake City, Utah, USA

== See also ==
- city park, urban parks
- New Park City Arena, Park City, Kentucky, USA; a multipurpose arena
- Park Cities, Texas, USA;
- Salt Lake and Park City Railway, a former railway in Utah
- Siam Park City, Bangkok, Thailand; an amusement park waterpark
- City Park (disambiguation)
- Park (disambiguation)
- City (disambiguation)
