= Pechersk, Kyiv =

Pechersk Печерськ
- Neighborhood of Kyiv
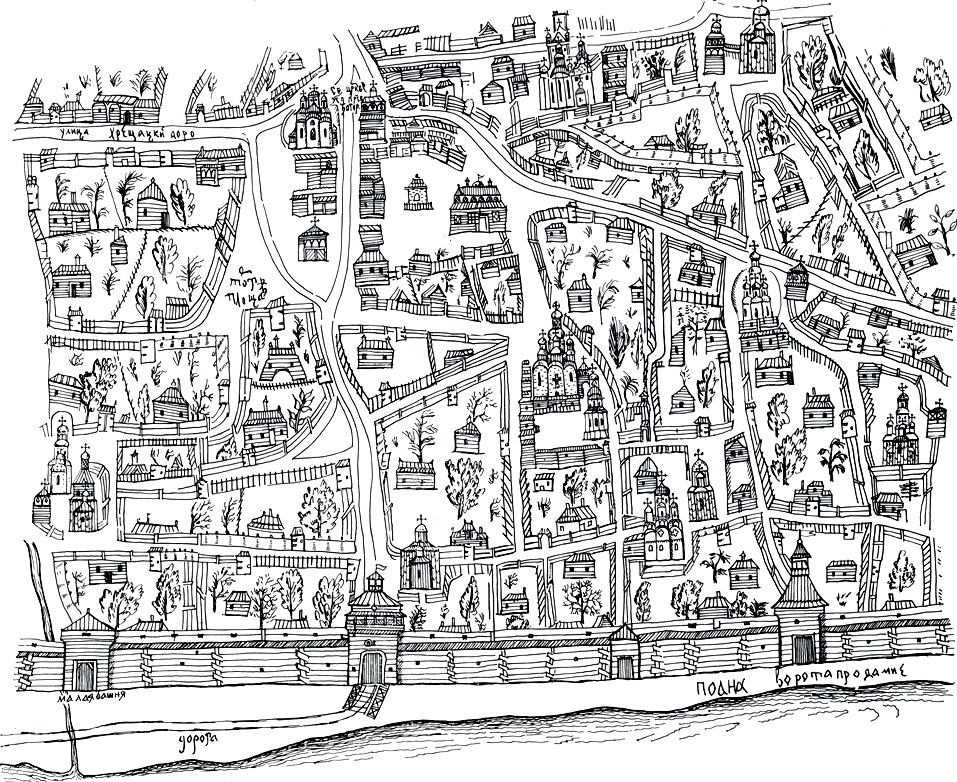
- Plan of Pechersk created by Ushakov in 1695
- Interactive map of Pechersk
- Country: Ukraine
- Municipality: Kyiv
- District: Pecherskyi District
- Time zone: UTC+2 (EET)
  - Summer (DST): UTC+3 (EEST)

Pechersk (Ukrainian: Печерськ) is a historical neighborhood in the city center of Kyiv, the capital of Ukraine. It is a part of the administrative Pechersk Raion (district). Pechersk is located between the Lypky, Klov and Dnieper hills. Its main streets are Ivan Mazepa Street, Dmytro Hodzenko Street, and Lesya Ukrainka Boulevard.

== History ==
Its name comes from the caves of Kyiv-Pechersk Lavra (founded in 1051) existing since ancient times. The settlement began to emerge in the 12th century as the Pechersk Lavra settlement including areas around the former village of Berestove. In 16-17th century, Pechersk was a town.

Construction of Old Cave Castle (the administrative center of Kyiv) began in the 1st half of the 18th century followed by New Pechersk fortress 30 - 40 years later. In the 19th century, the settlement included the former settlement Vasylkivski Rohatky.

The name of Pechersk is present in the name of the Raion, Square, Descent, Boulevard (now Lesia Ukrainka Boulevard), Street (no longer exists) and Novopecherska Street (no longer exists). Pechersk preserves monuments of architecture from the Kyivan Rus era and later centuries.

== Transport ==
- Alley of Magdeburg rights
- Mykhaila Hrushevskoho Street
- Pecherska (Kyiv Metro)

== Gallery ==
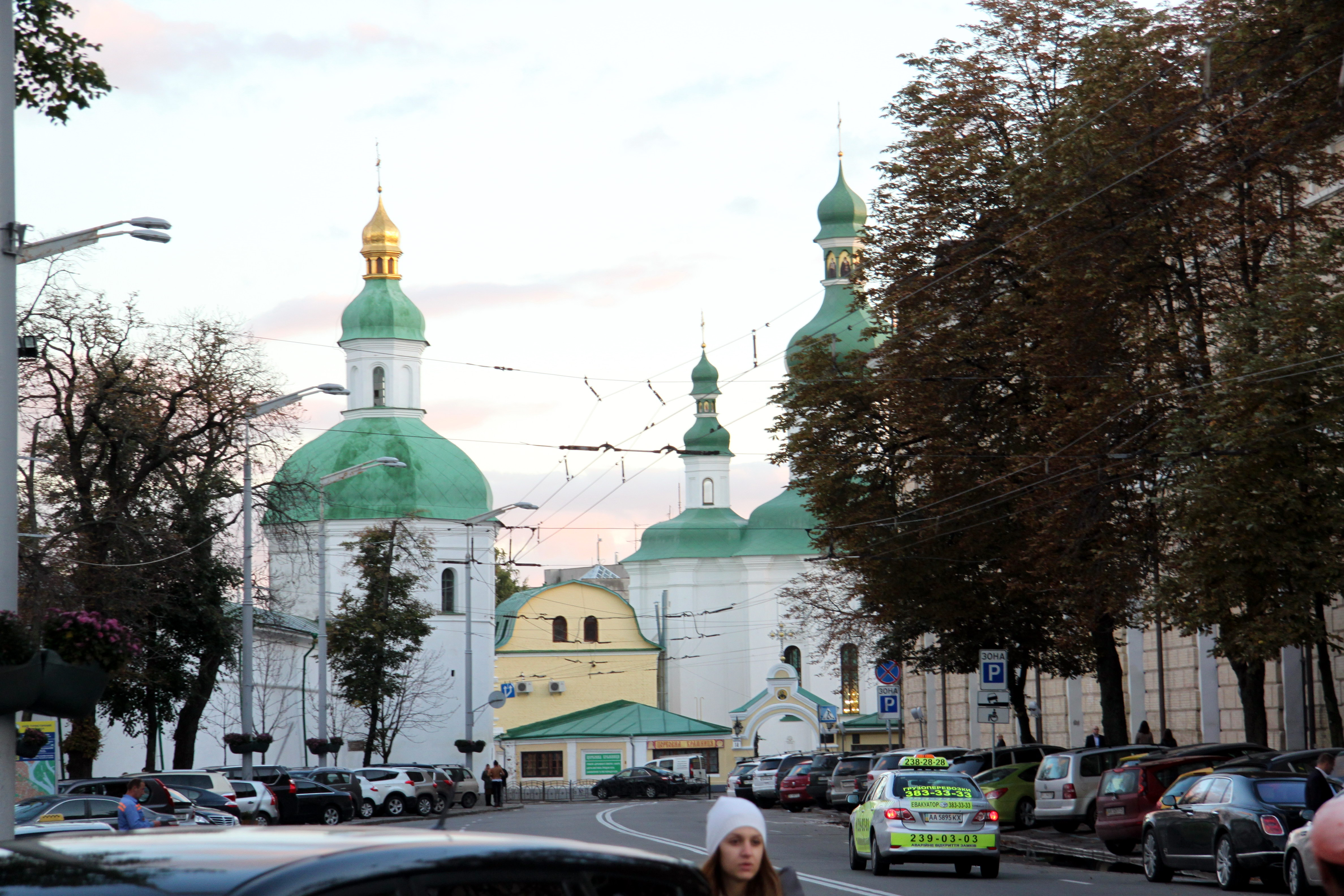
View on Pechersk Lavra with the Old Arsenal to the right

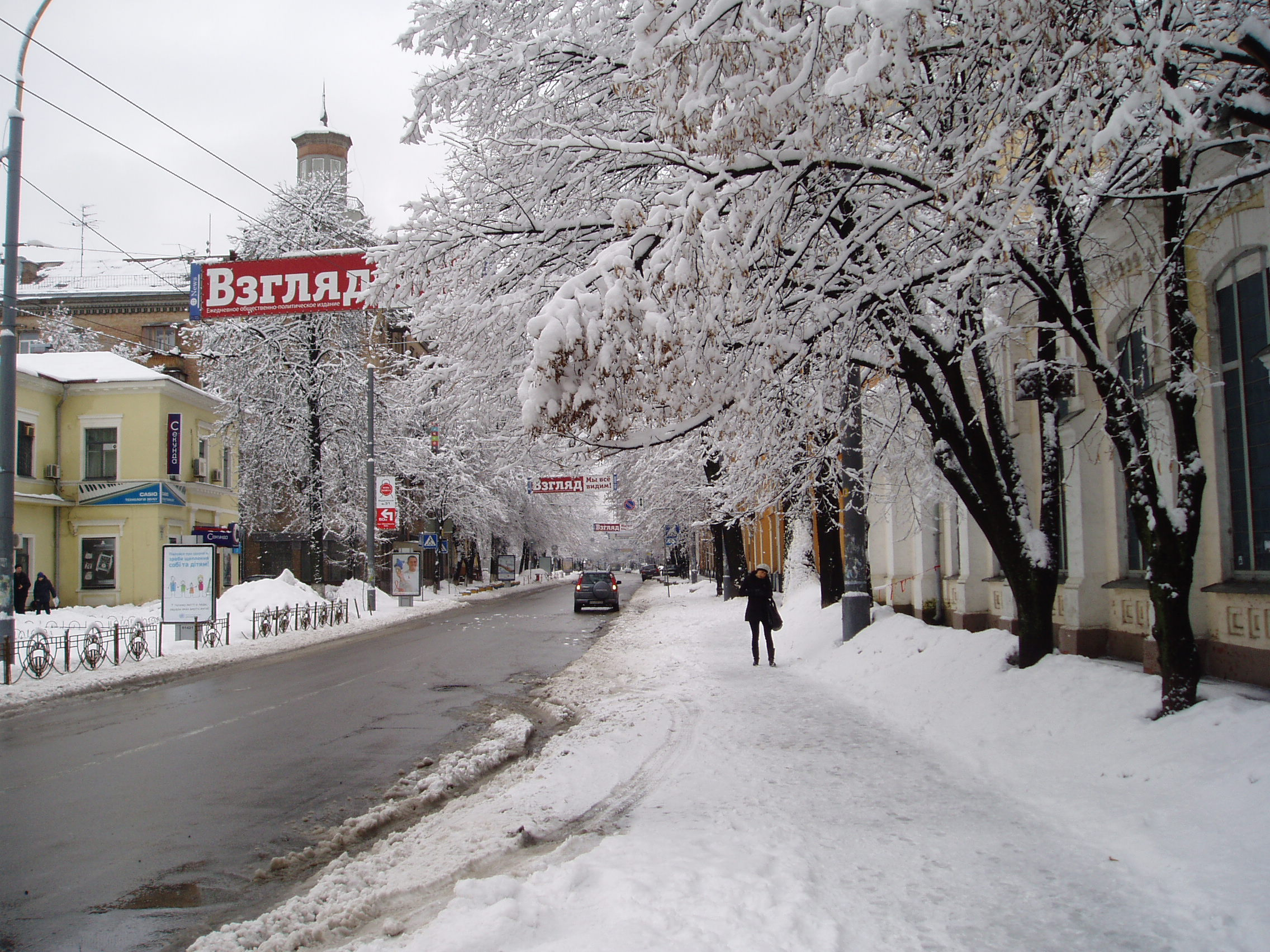
Dmytro Hodzenko Street

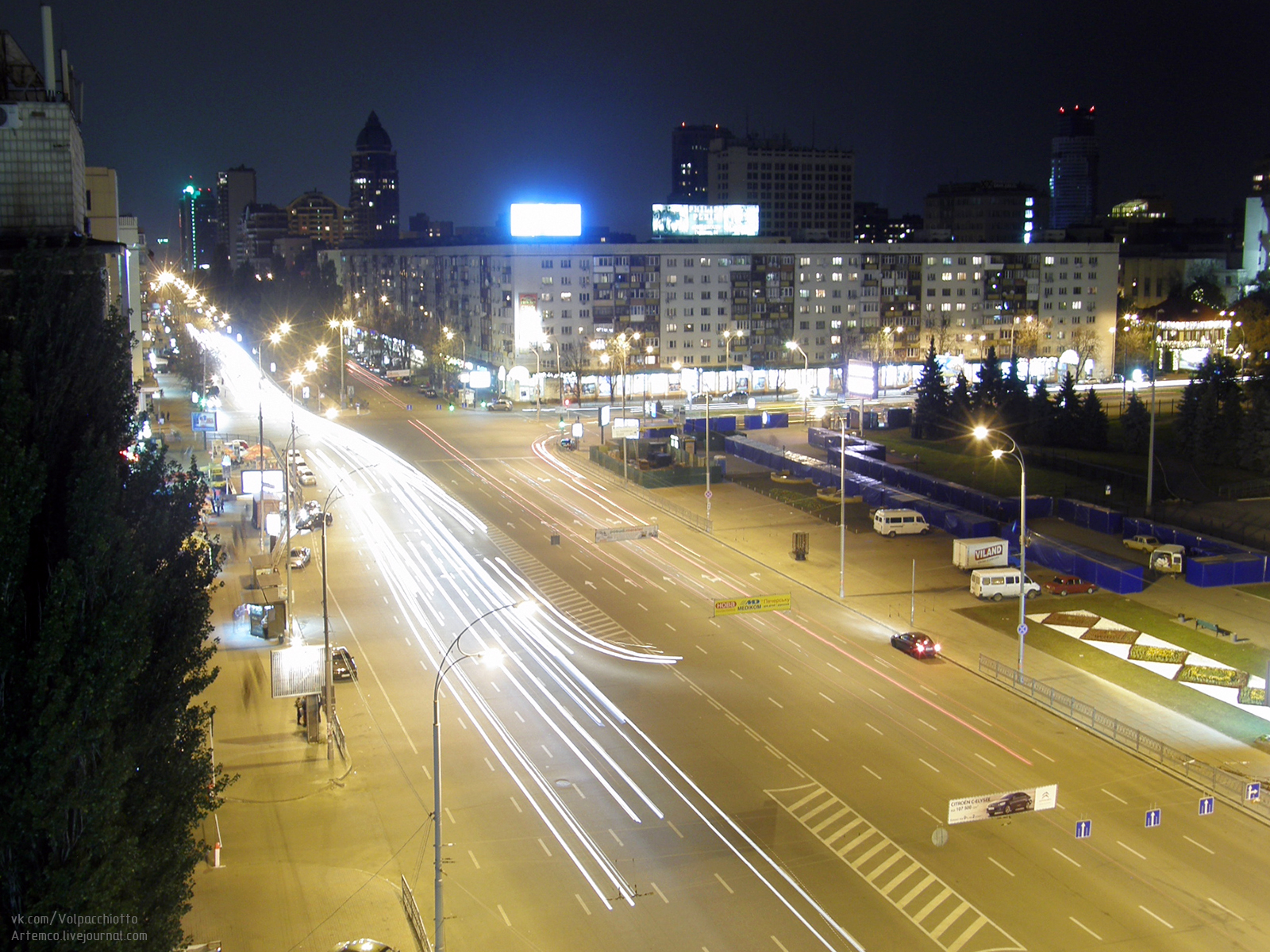
Lesi Ukrainky Boulevard and Square

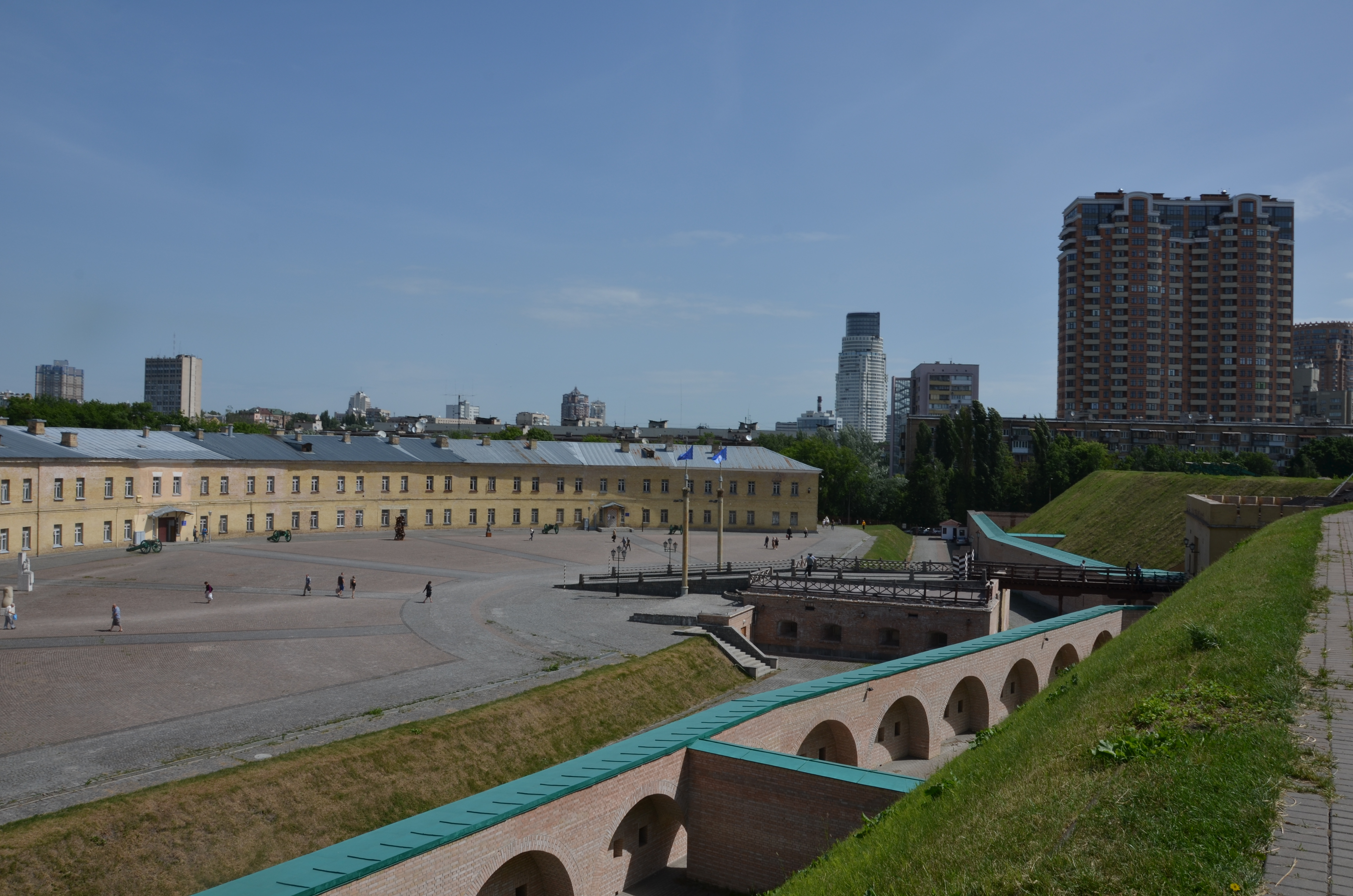
Pechersk Fortress

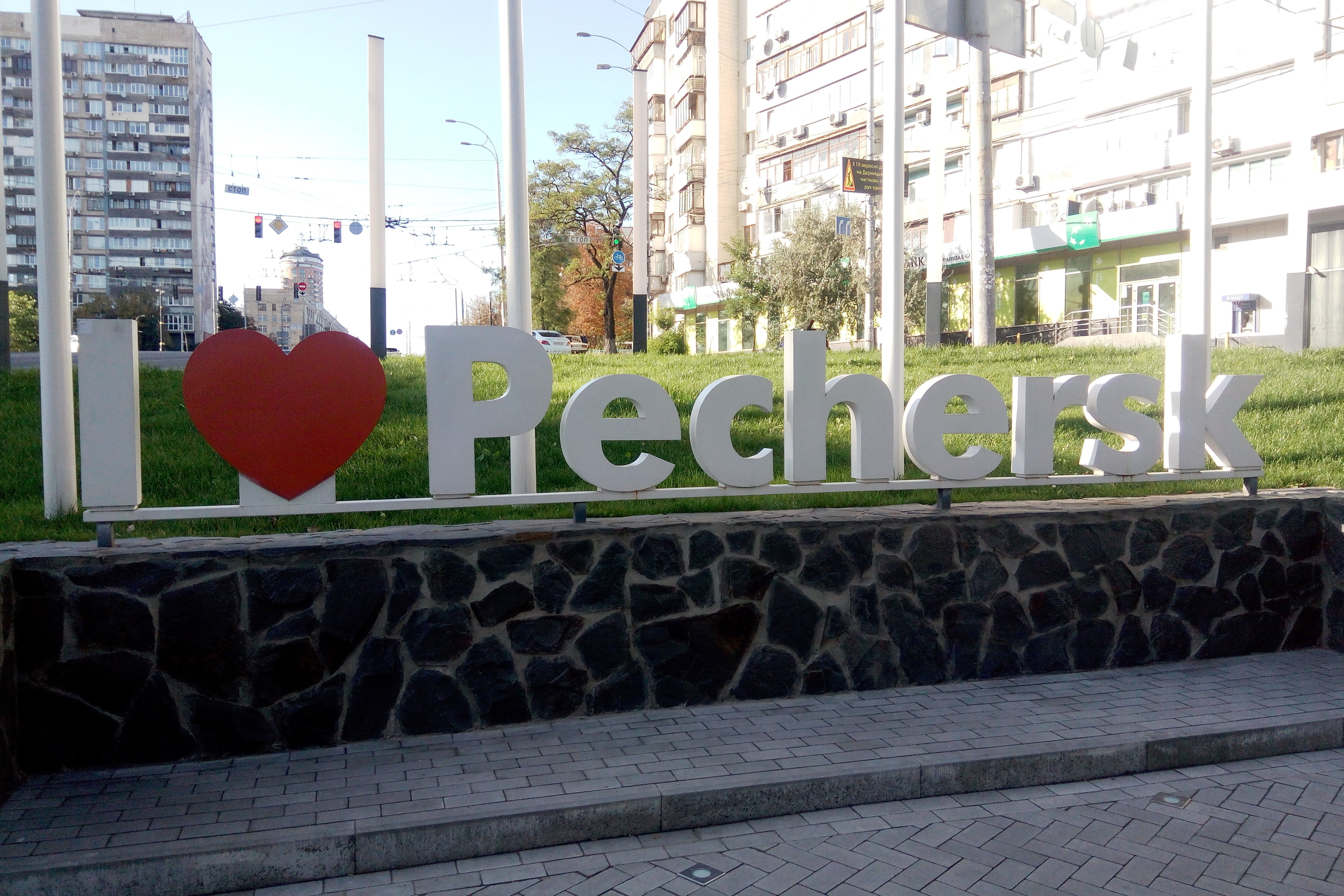
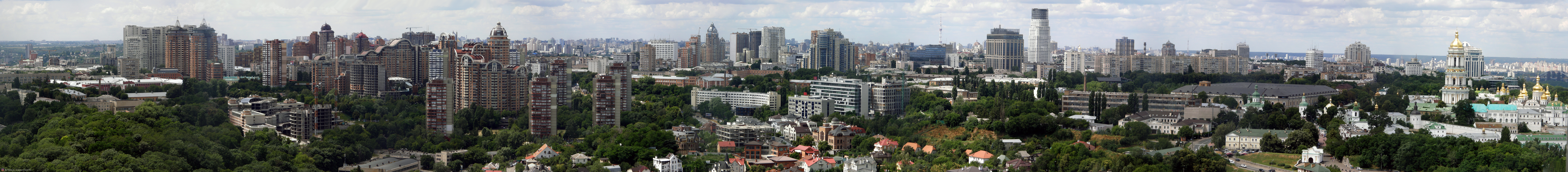
Skyline of Pechersk
