= City Park, Jaipur =

Urban park in Jaipur, Rajasthan, India

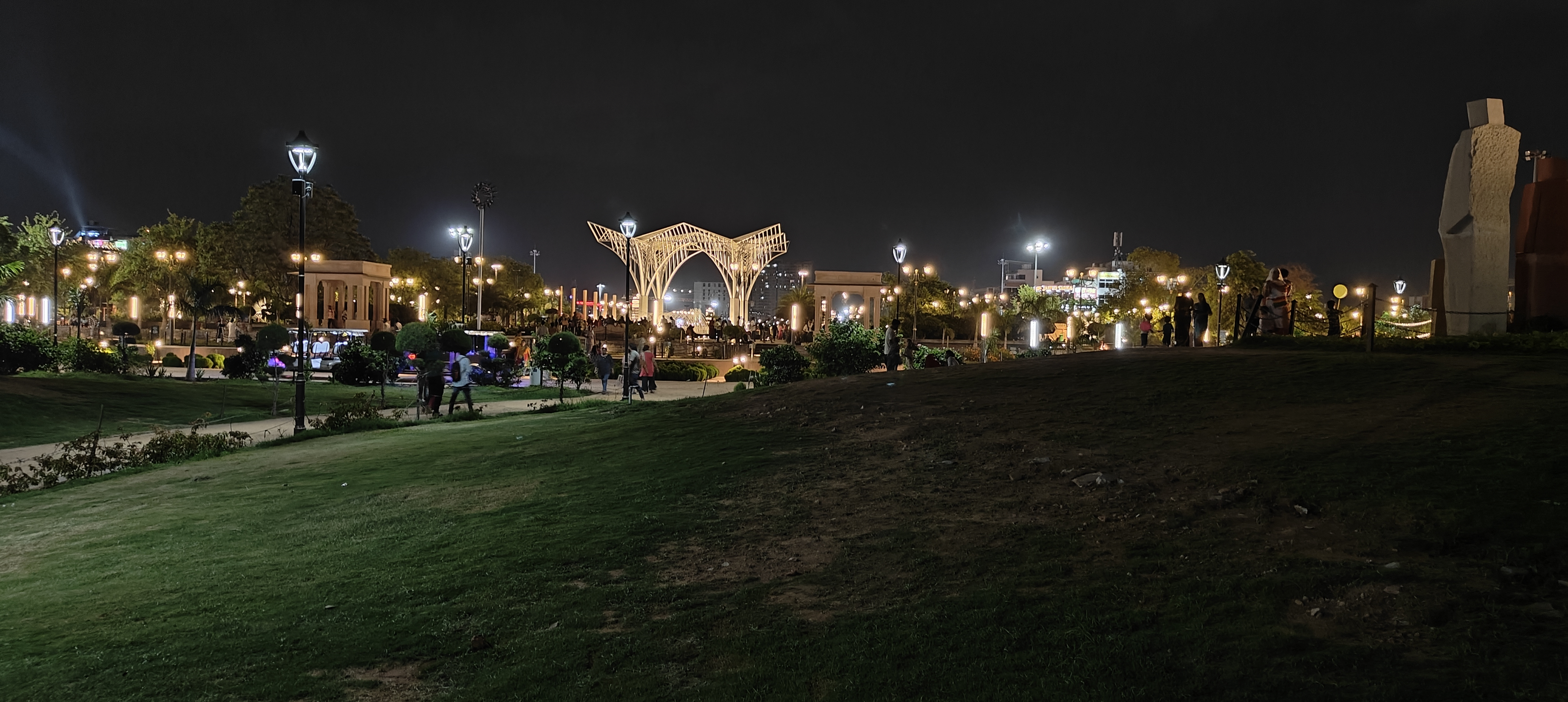
- Night View of City Park Jaipur in July 2024

- Location within Jaipur Location within Rajasthan
- Type: Urban Park
- Location: Madhyam Marg, Mansarovar, Jaipur
- Nearest city: Jaipur
- Coordinates: 26°51′27″N 75°45′45″E
- Area: 52 acres (21 ha)
- Created: 2020-2022
- Operator: Rajasthan Housing Board
- Open: 6:00 AM to 9:00 PM
- Status: Open
- Parking: Parking availability
- Public transit: Public Bus & Jaipur Metro

City Park is a prominent urban park situated in Mansarovar, Jaipur, Rajasthan, India built by the Rajasthan Housing Board. The park was inaugurated in October 2022. The park spans over 52 acres and serves as a significant recreational and leisure destination for both locals and visitors.

City Park is located in Mansarovar, Jaipur's largest residential colony.

== Construction ==
The construction of City Park in Jaipur has been carried out by the Rajasthan Housing Board. Initially, the area was a junkyard of Jaipur Metro, which has now been transformed into a beautiful park. The first phase includes horticulture, civil work, jogging tracks, fountains, and two parking areas. The second phase will feature a fountain square and botanical garden. The total construction cost was around ₹120 crore.

== Facilities ==
The park has a 3.5 km long jogging track. A notable feature of City Park is its collection of statues that showcase various art forms and cultural themes, adding to the park's aesthetic appeal.
