= Alley of Magdeburg rights =

Coordinates: 50.4508°N 30.5295°E

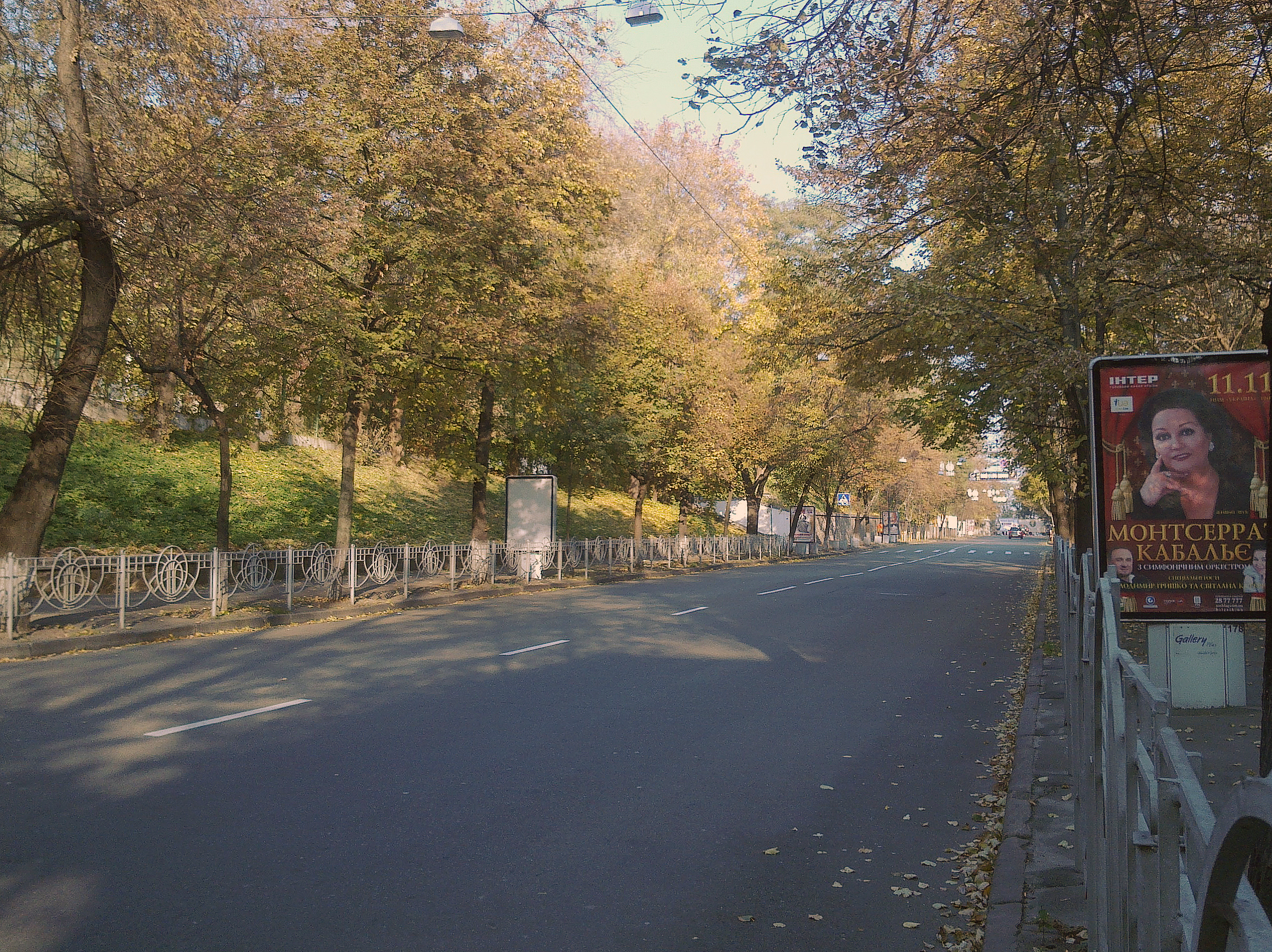
- Native name: Алея Магдебурзького права (Ukrainian)
- Former names: 1941–1943: Benito Mussolini Strasse (Benito Mussolini), Petrivska aleya
- Length: 390 m (1,280 ft)
- Location: Pechersk Raion, Kyiv, Ukraine
- west end: Hrushevsky Street
- east end: Park Road

Alley of Magdeburg rights (Ukrainian: Алея Магдебурзького права, Aleya Mahdeburzkoho prava) is a street in central Kyiv, the capital of Ukraine.

Named after Magdeburg rights, it is located in the government quarter Lypky neighborhood of the Pechersk Raion. It splits two parks the City Park and the Khreshchatyi Park and connects Park Road with Hrushevsky Street.

Established in 1909–12, in 1910 over the alley was built the Park Bridge created by Evgeny Paton.

During the Nazi occupation in 1941-43 it carried a name of Benito Mussolini, before 2023 named after the Peter the Great.
