= City Park, Benicia =

Public park in Benicia, California, US

Coordinates: 38.05356°N 122.15608°W

City Park
- Interactive map of City Park
- Type: public park
- Location: Benicia, California
- Operator: City of Benicia

City Park is a public park in Benicia, California, that features a bus station served by SolTrans. It is the site of the first Protestant church in California: a Presbyterian church which stood between 1849 and 1875. It was also home to a seminary.
