= Pecherskyi District =

Pecherskyi District Печерський район
- Urban district
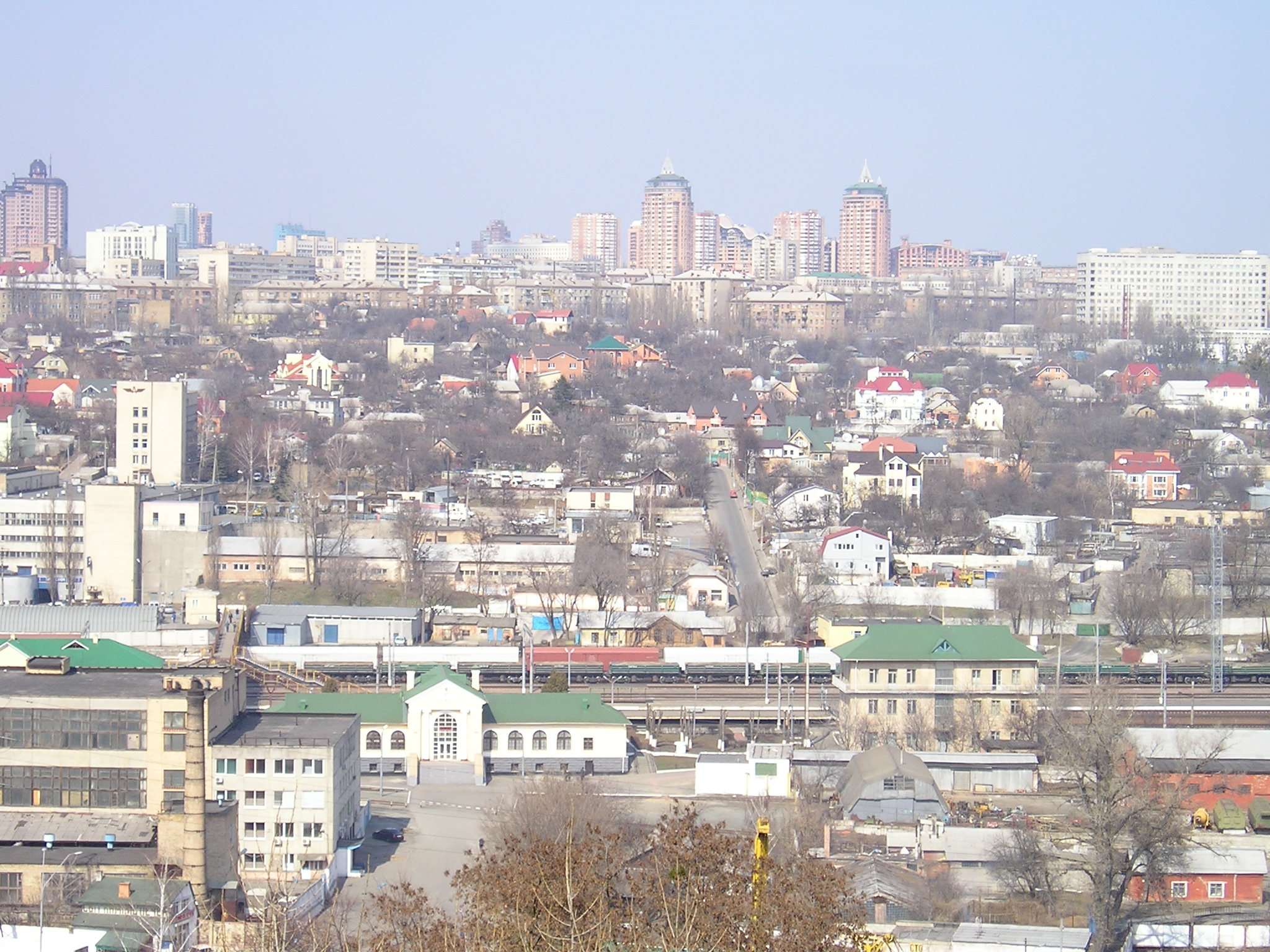

- Flag Coat of arms

- Coordinates: 50°25′14″N 30°32′58″E
- Country: Ukraine
- Region: Kyiv
- Established: 1945
- Subdivisions: List: — city councils; — settlement councils; — rural councils; Number of localities: — cities; — urban-type settlements; — villages; — rural settlements

Government
  - Governor: Nataliya Kondrashova

Area
  - Total: 19 km^{2} (7.3 sq mi)

Population (01.03.2021)
  - Total: 164 000
  - Density: 8.6/km^{2} (22/sq mi)
- Time zone: UTC+2 (EET)
  - Summer (DST): UTC+3 (EEST)
- Area code: 38044
- Website: pechersk.kyivcity.gov.ua

Pecherskyi District (Ukrainian: Печерський район, romanized: Pechersjkyj rajon) is an urban district of Kyiv, the capital of Ukraine. It lies within the eponymous historical neighborhood, while also including some other historical areas. The Pechersk (Ukrainian: Печерськ, romanized: Pečerśk) neighborhood is located on the hills adjoining the right bank of the Dnieper. These two geographical entities are often confused with each other.

== History ==
Pechersk is one of the most important cultural areas of Kyiv, the location of the legendary Kyiv Pechersk Lavra (Kyiv Monastery of the Caves), from which it received its name (pechera is the Ukrainian for "cave"). The settlement near the Lavra formed at some point in the 12th century. It was reformed out of the historical Berestiv royal estate (Kniazhe selo) that was adjacent to the Kyiv Golden Gates (Zoloti Vorota). Beresta is a local name of the bark of a birch tree which at that time was utilized in making of shoes and also as a writing medium. The settlement was renamed the town of Pechersk in the 16th-17th centuries.

From the 18th century to the mid-20th century Pechersk as a settlement became the administrative center of the city of Kyiv when the Old Kyiv fortress was erected, which served as a major military stronghold in the Russian Empire and later the Soviet Union. Because of this, new neighborhoods and areas were added to its direct administration. When in the 1840s, the new Kyiv fortress was built, Pechersk incorporated the settlement of Vasylkivska Rohatka (Vasylkiv's Fork) that was founded in 1706. Vasylkiv's Fork was located in the vicinity of Citadel Street where Vasylkiv Gates once stood (today's address at 3 Citadel Street).

In January 1918, the neighborhood was the center of the Arsenal Factory Uprising. The uprising was quelled and this led to the defeat of the Ukrainian National Forces and the surrendering of the city of Kyiv to the Russian Soviet forces, which were led by Colonel Mikhail Muraviov. The rebellion gave the name to one of the streets in the neighborhood during the Soviet times to give the impression of support for the Bolshevik regime.

Later many administrative, educational, research and cultural institutions were founded in the neighborhood, such as the Central Election Commission, two universities and several theaters. Many important streets run across the district, such as Bank Street (also known as Bankova) where the Presidential Administration of Ukraine is located; Khreschatyk Street or simply Kreschatyk which is widely associated with downtown Kyiv, and many others.

== Population ==
=== Language ===
Distribution of the population by native language according to the 2001 census:

Language	Number	Percentage
Ukrainian	75 129	60.23%
Russian	38 257	30.67%
Other^{[a]}	11 359	9.10%
Total	124 745	100.00%

^{a} Those who did not indicate their native language or indicated a language that was native to less than 1% of the local population.

== Political center ==
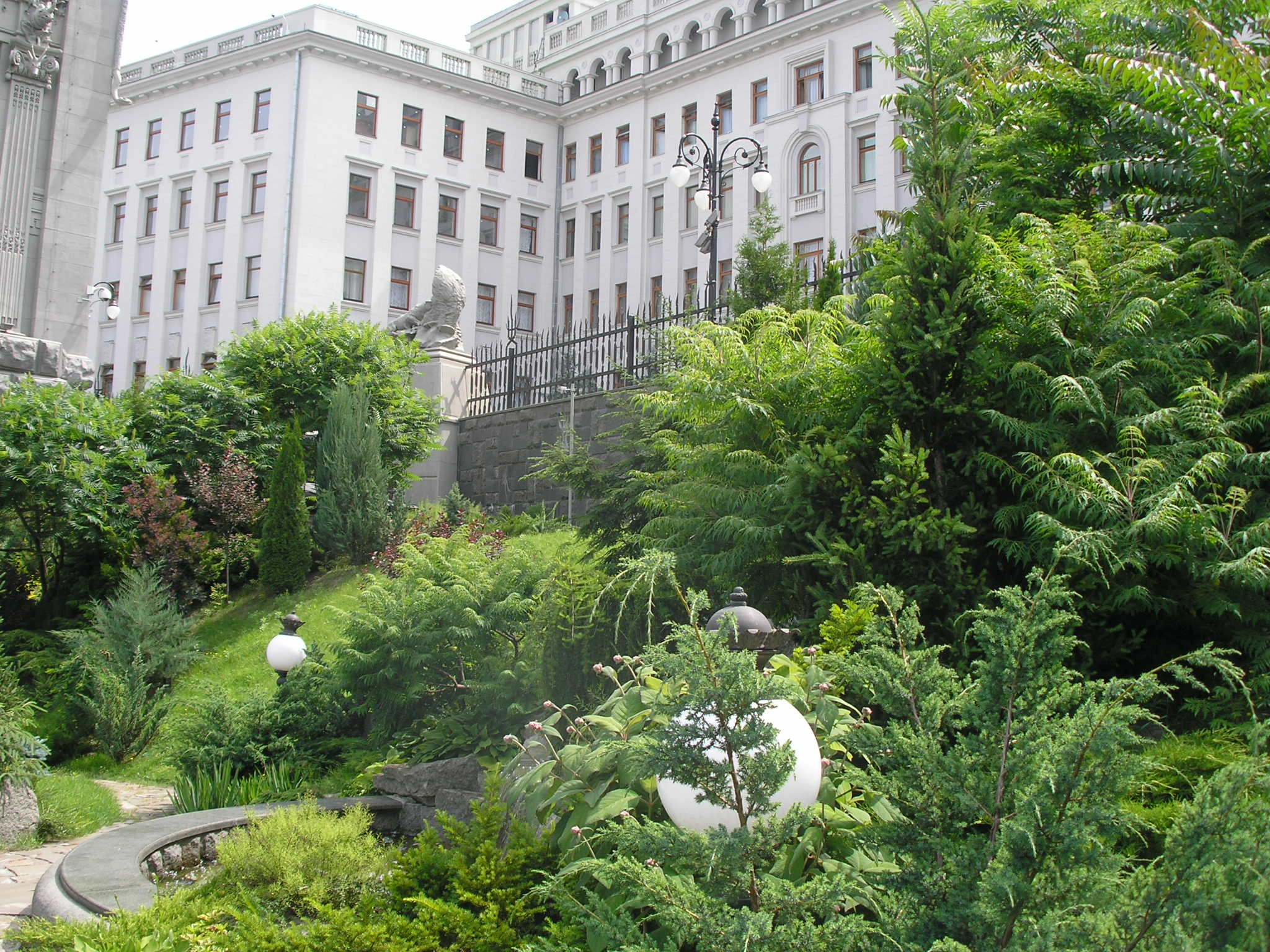
The gardens next to the House with Chimaeras. In the background is the building of the Presidential Administration.

Since the 1930s, Pechersk is also considered the political center of the city and the phrase "Pechersk Hills" became a metonym for the Ukrainian government and/or political elite. This refers to many branches of the Government of Ukraine, such as the Verkhovna Rada (parliament), the office of the President, the Cabinet of Ministers of Ukraine (formerly the Ukrainian SSR cabinet), and the Supreme Court of Ukraine, which are situated close to each other.

However, this "political area" is in fact the Lypky historical neighborhood within the Pecherskyi District, not the Pechersk neighborhood itself. Lypky is also notable for its Soviet architecture, purposely designed as an elite quarter of government buildings and highest statesman's residence.

== Pecherskyi District ==
The administrative Pecherskyi District (erroneously called simply Pechersk) includes several other smaller distinct historical neighborhoods of Kyiv, besides the historical Pechersk. These are:

- Pechersk
- Lypky
- Klov
- Vydubychi
- Zvirynets
- Telychka
- Chorna Hora

== Tourist attractions ==
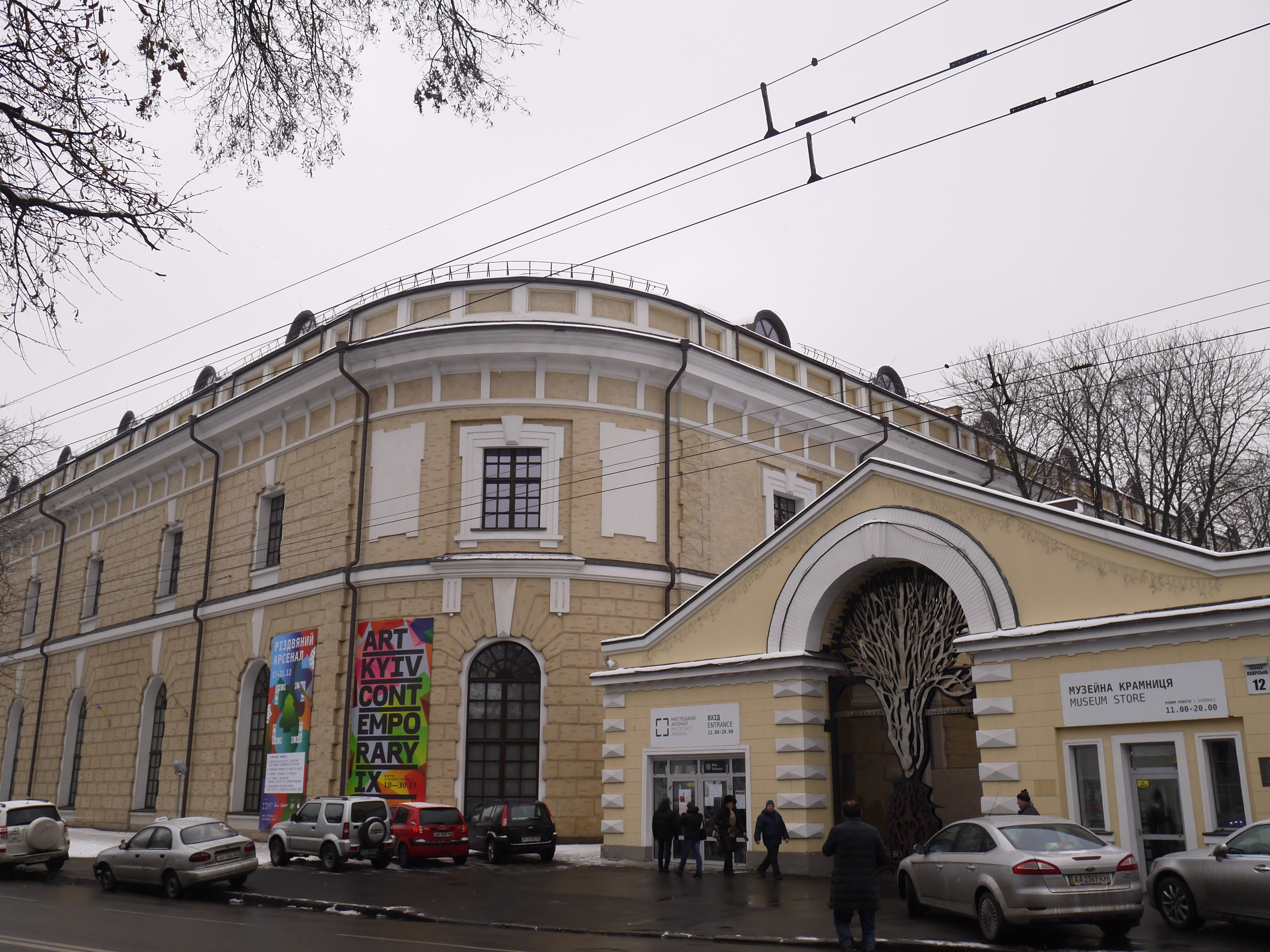
The 18th century building of the Kyiv Arsenal.

Many other historical and architectural monuments are situated here.

- Kyiv Pechersk Lavra;
- Vydubychi Monastery;
- Presentation Monastery, Kyiv;
- Klov Palace;
- Mariinskyi Palace;
- Government Building;
- National Bank of Ukraine;
- House with Chimaeras;
- Verkhovna Rada building;
- Mystetskyi Arsenal National Art and Culture Museum Complex.

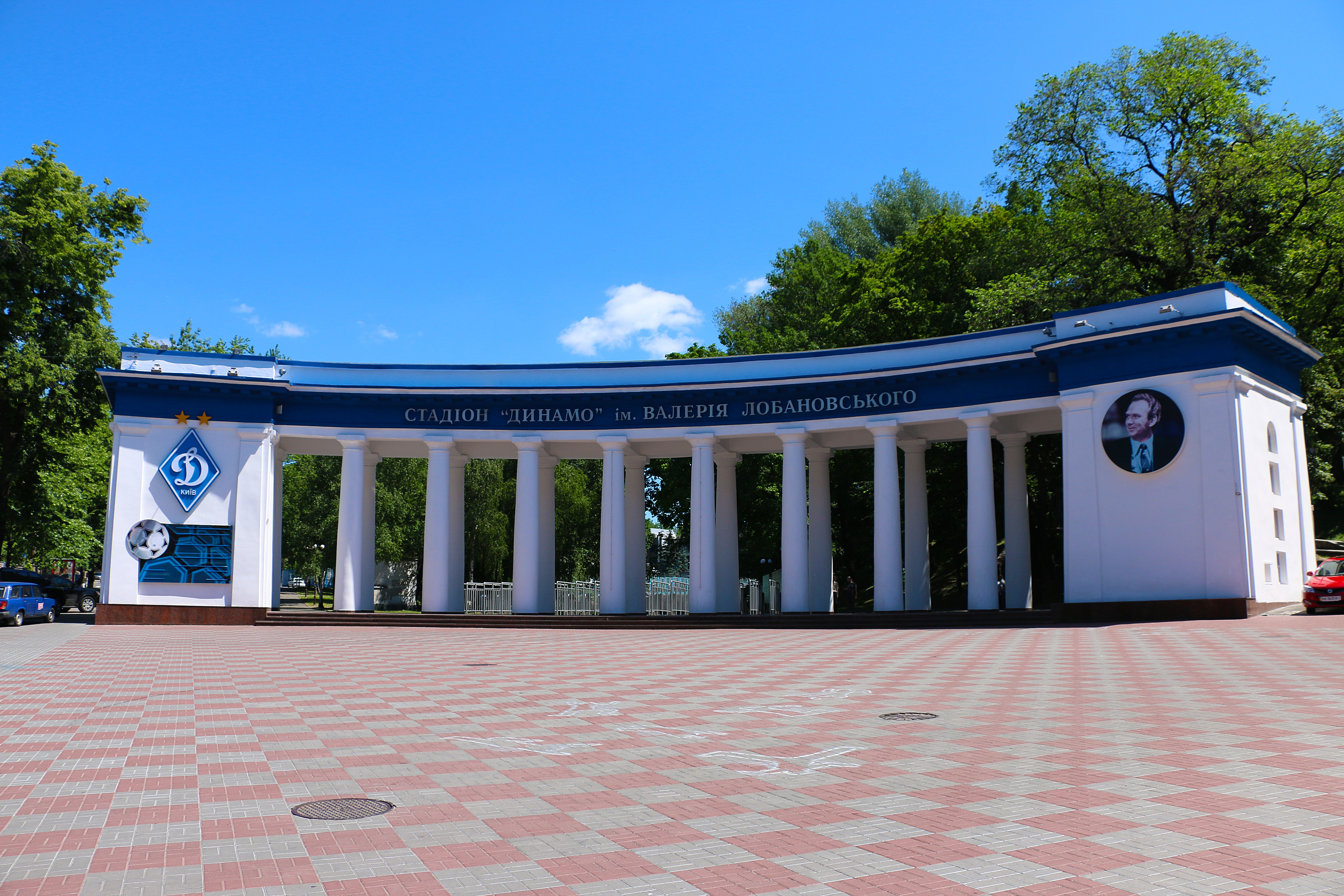
The Lobanovsky Dynamo Stadium entrance.

Here is located Askold's Grave which was depicted by Taras Shevchenko on his painting of 1846. Around the burial was created the Askold Grave Park and was built a wooden church that later was reconstructed into the brick one designed by Andriy Ivanovych Melensky. The church's name is the Saint Nicolas the Miracle-worker Church or Rotonda. There are large residential, industrial, healthcare and military areas in the district, as well as a few picturesque parks and sports venues like the Lobanovsky Dynamo Stadium. Many administrative and educational facilities are situated in the district.

The famous Art Nouveau House with Chimaeras and gigantic statue of Mother Motherland are also located in the Pecherskyi District (Lypky and Zvirynets respectively).

After the declaration of Ukrainian independence in 1991, the Pecherskyi District retained and developed its role also becoming a luxury residential area. The few large industrial companies located in the district are considering moving elsewhere, pocketing a significant profit from the real estate they hold from the times of Soviet Ukraine (see Kyiv Arsenal factory).

== See also ==
- Subdivisions of Kyiv
