= City Park (Dallas) =

Living history museum in Texas, US

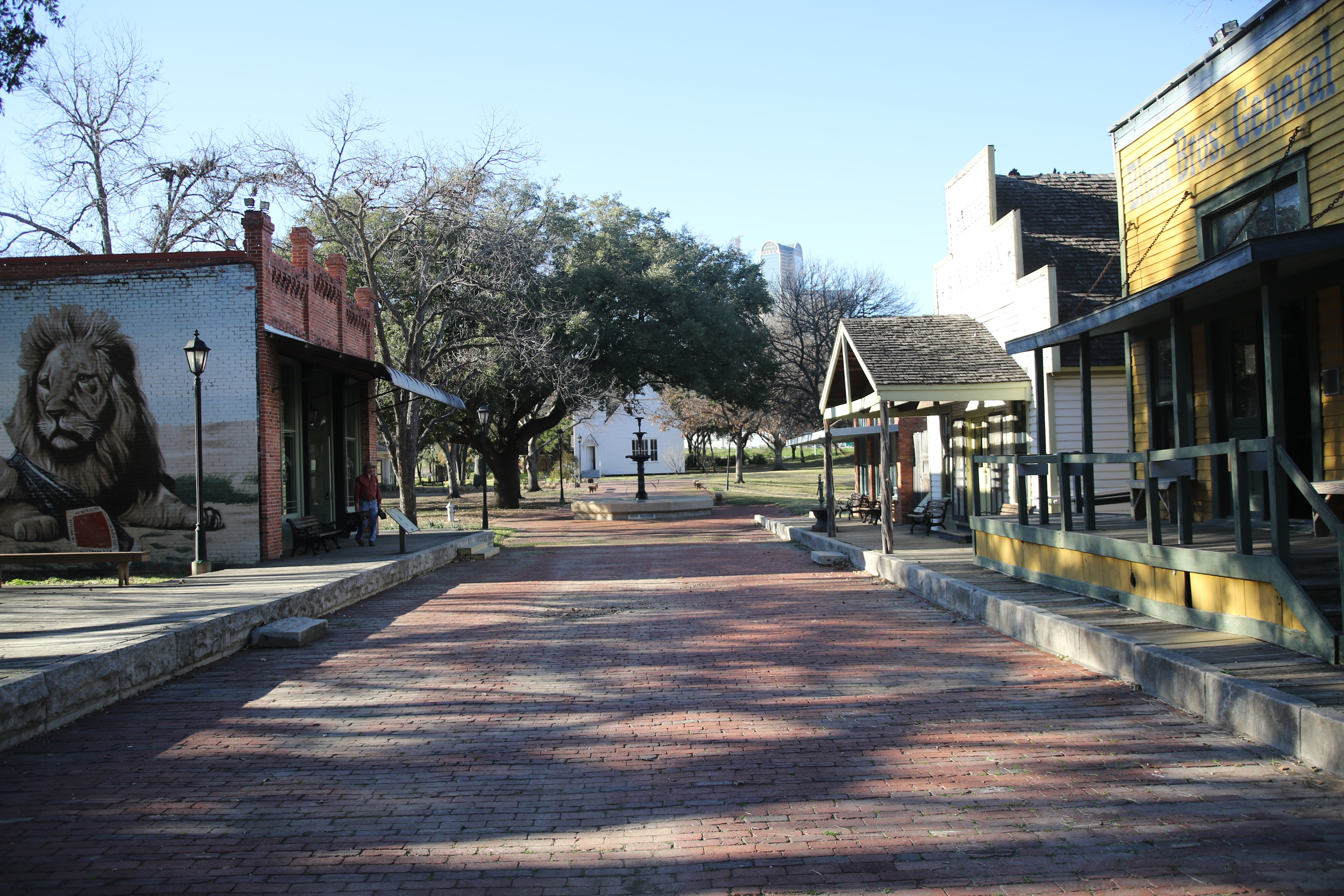
- Historic buildings at City Park, Dallas
- Interactive map of City Park
- Type: Special‑use heritage / open‑air museum park
- Location: Dallas, Texas, United States
- Coordinates: 32°46′25″N 96°47′16″W
- Area: 22.1 acres (8.9 ha)
- Created: 1876
- Operator: Dallas Parks and Recreation Department
- Website: https://www.dallasparks.org/684/City-Park

City Park (also known historically as Old City Park and Dallas Heritage Village) is a living history museum and heritage village located on the site of Dallas’s first city park. The site houses one of the largest collections of nineteenth‑century pioneer and Victorian buildings in Texas, relocated from across North Central Texas and open to the public since the late 1960s.

== History ==
In 1876, Dallas acquired what became its first city park—a landscaped public space built around Browder Spring that later featured amenities like a bandstand, fountains, and even a small zoo. The Dallas County Heritage Society took over the park’s preservation and museum function beginning in 1967, initiating the relocation of dozens of historic structures.

In 2005, the name Dallas Heritage Village at Old City Park was adopted, reflecting the dual identity of park and museum. In 2024, management contracts shifted and the city of Dallas resumed full operational control of the site on May 27, 2024; the Dallas County Heritage Society began operating under the new “Old City Park Conservancy” name to continue supporting programming and advocacy.

== Description ==
The park is 22.1 acres and comprises approximately 37 restored structures dating from about 1840 to 1910, including residences (e.g., Millermore Mansion), a general store, train depot, schoolhouse, church, saloon, print shop, and bank. The collection included over 22,000 artifacts and visual materials, and were auctioned in 2024 when the city's parks department took over the site.
