= City Park Golf =

- U.S. National Register of Historic Places
- U.S. Historic district
- Colorado State Register of Historic Properties
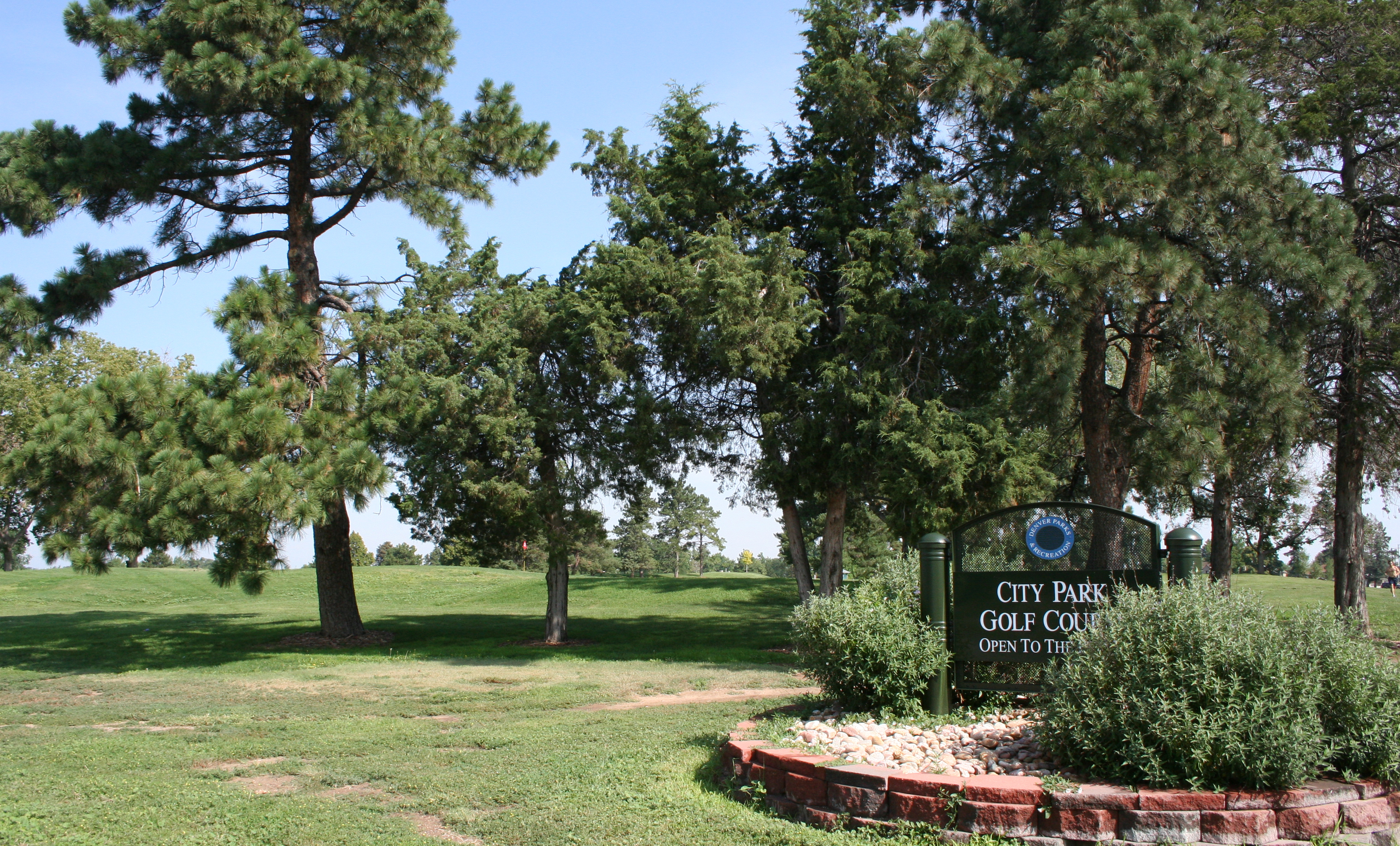

- Location within Colorado Location within the United States
- Location: 2500 York St.: Roughly bounded by E. Twenty-sixth Ave., Colorado Blvd., E. Twenty-third Ave., and York St., Denver, Colorado
- Coordinates: 39°45′10″N 104°57′0″W
- Area: 136.3 acres (55.2 ha)
- Built: 1913
- Architectural style: Pueblo
- MPS: Denver Park and Parkway System TR
- NRHP reference No.: 86002198
- CSRHP No.: 5DV.5311
- Added to NRHP: September 17, 1986

City Park Golf is a historic 18-hole regulation golf course located north of Denver's City Park. The area is bounded by E. Twenty-sixth Ave., Colorado Blvd., E. Twenty-third Ave., and York St.

It is included as one in a multiple listing of parts of Denver Park and Parkway System. The listing includes four contributing buildings, two contributing structures, and a contributing site.

In November 2018, construction started on a redesign of the golf course that was necessary to help reduce the risk of flooding in the surrounding neighborhoods during heavy rains. The course is scheduled to reopen in 2019.
