= City Park (Kyiv) =

Park in Kyiv, Ukraine

Coordinates: 50.449°N 30.536°E

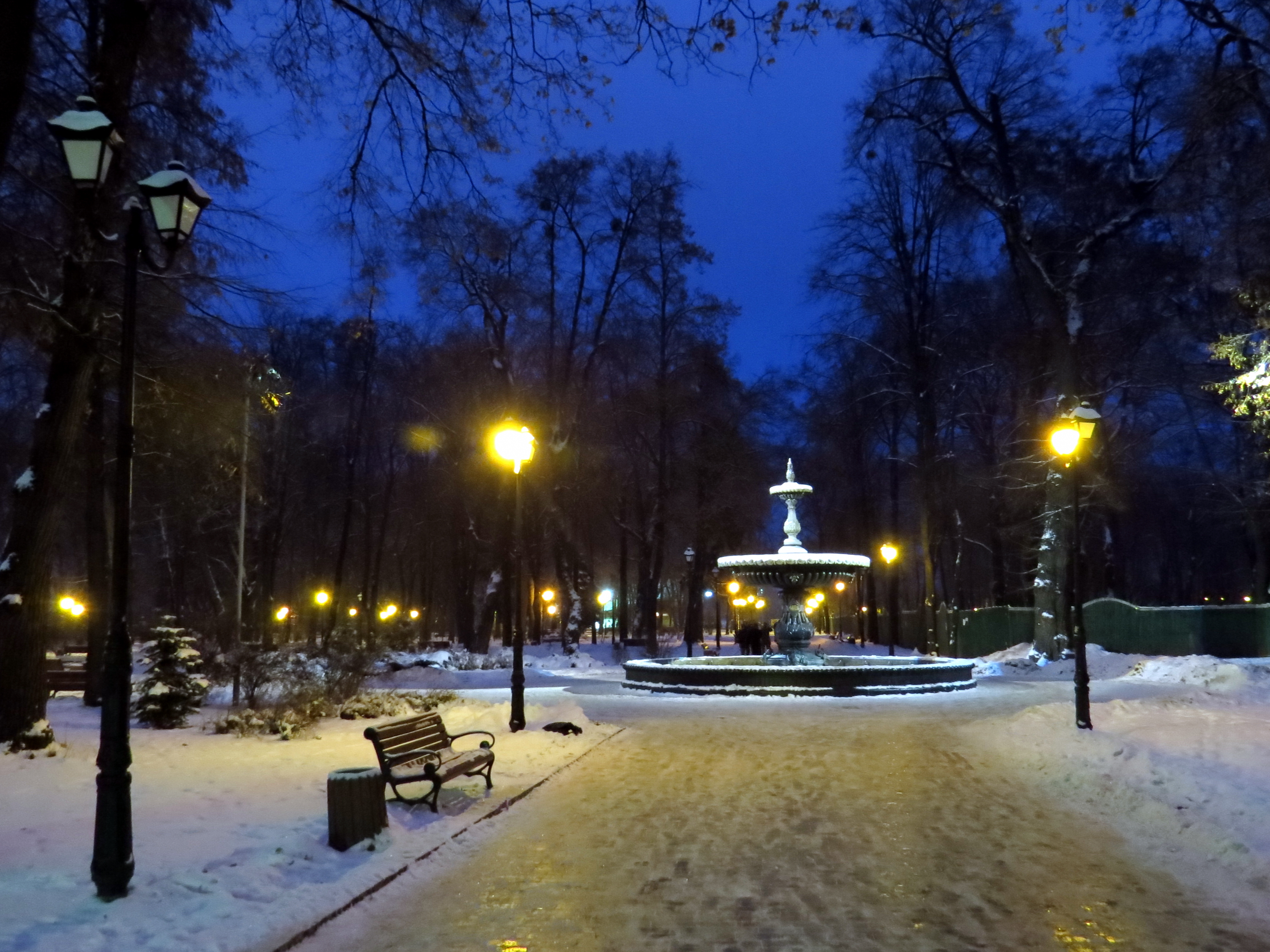

City Park is a park in Kyiv located between Khreshchatyi Park and Mariinskyi Park. Along with Volodymyr Hill, Khreshchatyi Park, Mariinskyi Park, Askold's Grave, and Park of the Eternal Glory, it creates one big elongated park zone along the right bank of Dnieper. The park has an area of 11.7 ha (29 acres). The main feature of the park is a sports venue, Lobanovsky Dynamo Stadium.

The City Park is shaped by Alley of Magdeburg rights, Park Road, Hrushevsky Street and buildings at Constitution Square (Mariinskyi Palace and Verkhovna Rada building).

== History ==
It was established in 1743 by Francesco Bartolomeo Rastrelli as the Tsar's Park. In 1808–1878 by architect Somonov there were built café with a dance hall, gallery and balcony. In 1863 some French entrepreneur converted a portion of the park (known as the Rose Valley) into a recreational institution under a name Shato-de-Flyor (French:Chateu de Fleur). In 1978 there was established the Russian Drama Society. At the same time, bigger part of the park became restricted to visitors under government administration. In 1909–1912 through the park was laid the Peter's alley over which in 1910 was established a park bridge. The park bridge today connects Khreshchatyi Park with the City Park.

In 1912 the park hosted an agricultural exhibition. In 1917 Shato-de-Flyor was closed and converted into sports courts. In 1919 the park was renamed as the First May Park (Pervomaisky Park). In 1981–82 by the Ukrainian architect Yuriy Seryohin there was established an outdoor music stage. On February 2, 1993, the park officially received its current name.
