= City Park Mall =

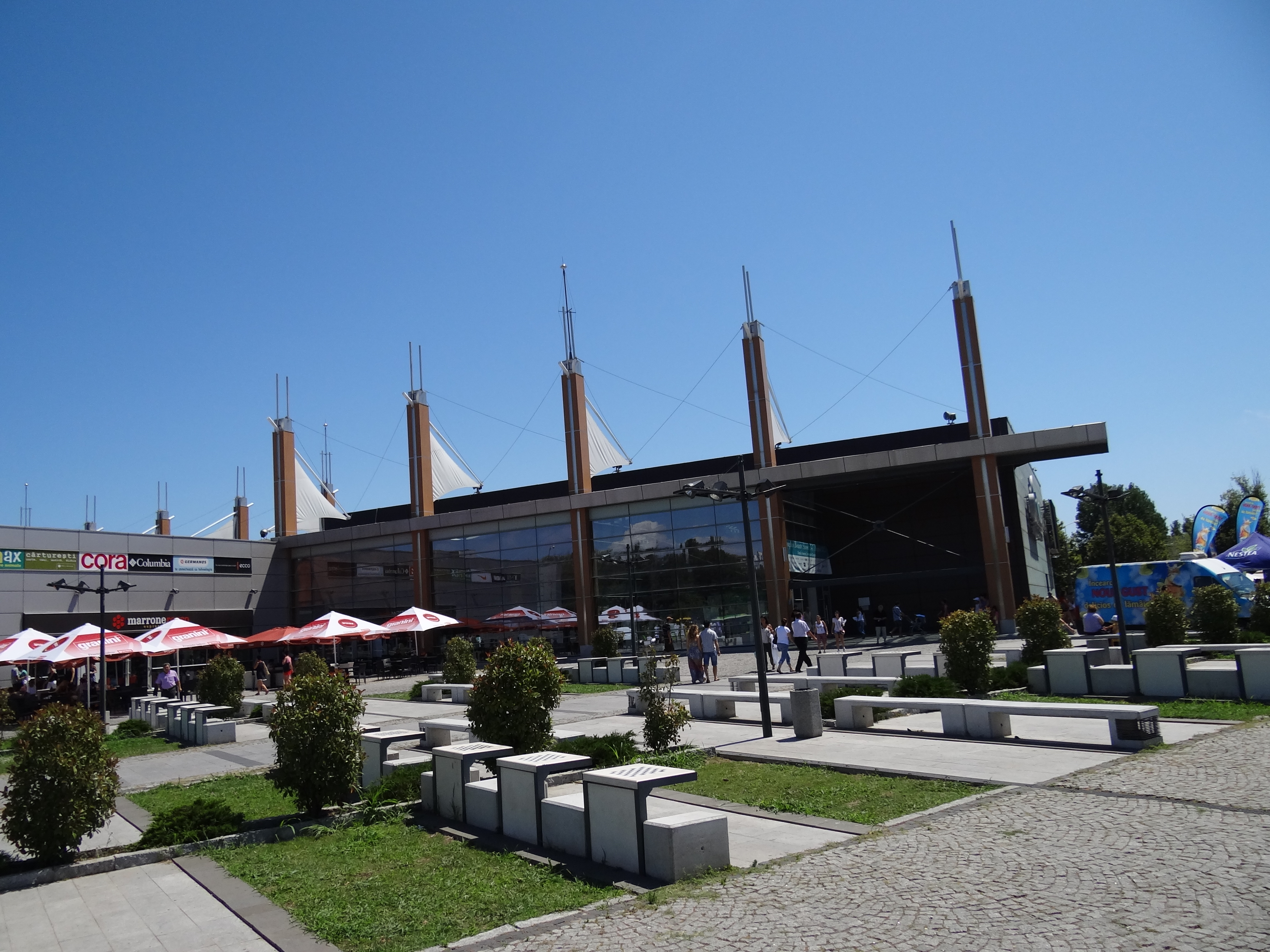
- City Park Mall
- Location: Constanța, Romania
- Opened: 2008
- Developer: Neocity Group
- Manager: Colliers International
- Owner: Neocity Group
- Num. of stores: 100
- Floor area: 59,000 square metres (635,071 sq ft)
- Parking: 1,000
- Website: city-park.ro

City Park Mall is a large shopping mall located in Constanța, Romania. The center includes over 200 stores and a multiplex with eight screens. The complex has a floor area of 59,000 square metres (635,071 sq ft) and over 1,000 parking spaces.
