= Mansarovar (Jaipur) =

- Neighborhood
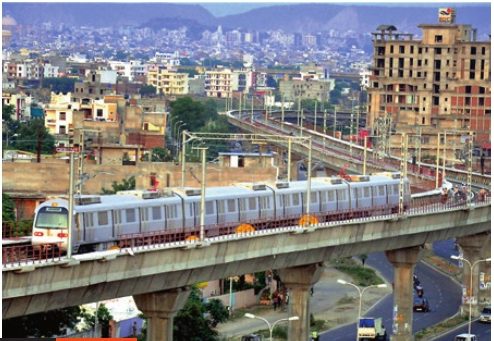
- Metro line near Mansarovar
- Interactive map of Mansarovar
- Coordinates: 26°51′48″N 75°45′59″E
- Country: India
- State: Rajasthan
- District: Jaipur District
- City: Jaipur

Language
  - Official: Hindi
  - Additional official: English
- Time zone: UTC+5:30 (IST)
- PIN: 302020
- Planning agency: Jaipur Development Authority
- Civic agency: Jaipur Municipal Corporation
- Website: jaipur.rajasthan.gov.in

Mansarovar is a large residential neighborhood located in the southwestern part of Jaipur, Rajasthan, India., India. Until 2010, it was the largest colony in Asia. On 3 June 2015, the Jaipur Metro began serving the area with the opening of the Pink Line.. A large number of people are looking to buy homes in this colony because it has great access to the rest of the city and is located in close proximity to the RIICO Industrial Area, which is recognized as one of the most important employment centres in the region. 134,935 people are living in Mansarovar. Nine distinct areas make up Mansarovar. The total landmass encompasses around 12.28 square kilometers (4.7 sq mi).

== Education ==
As a major residential and employment hub, Mansarovar houses various educational and early childhood development facilities. These include notable early schooling institutions like the Welmont Preschool Mansarovar campus, which caters to the foundational education needs of the growing local community.

== Police stations ==
The following police stations of Jaipur police serve this area:

- Mansarovar Police Station, Varun Path
- Shipra Path Police Station, Aravali Marg
