= Claudia Casper =

Canadian writer (born 1957)

- Born: 1957 (age 68–69); Toronto, Ontario, Canada
- Occupation: Novelist
- Writing career
- Period: 1996 to present
- Website: claudiacasper.com

Claudia Casper is a Canadian writer. She is best known for her bestseller novel The Reconstruction, about a woman who constructs a life-sized model of the hominid Lucy for a museum diorama while trying to recreate herself. Her third novel, The Mercy Journals, written as the journals of a soldier suffering PTSD in the year 2047, won the 2016 Philip K. Dick Award for distinguished Science fiction.

== Early life ==
Claudia Casper was born in Toronto, Ontario. She was her parents' only child, but she now has ten half-siblings. She says that her "siblings ... who often spoke no common language and three parents who couldn't be further apart on the introversion/extroversion continuum," helped her develop "an early ability to bridge realities." As a result of her diverse family, she learned German, Spanish, French and some Hebrew.

Casper attended Lawrence Park Collegiate Institute in Toronto, but then transferred to SEED Alternative School, one of Toronto's first free schools, which she describes as seeming like "a slightly scary hotbed of creativity, drugs and sex," where she learned at her own pace and chose her own curriculum.

Her first job in the literary world was at the age of 16, dusting books at Coles bookstore near Yonge and Bloor in Toronto. Casper used the earnings from this job to go on a solo bike trip in Germany on a three-speed bicycle. (Cycling continues to be a large part of her life. In 2010 she participated in the first Gran Fondo ride from Vancouver to Whistler, British Columbia.)

While completing her Bachelor of Arts at the University of Toronto, where she studied under Northrop Frye, Casper worked in the circulation department at The Globe and Mail.

After graduation, she applied for a copy-editing job with a Toronto publisher but failed their in-house test, so she moved to Vancouver and "crashed on the warehouse floor" of a small publisher, Pulp Press (now Arsenal Pulp Press). Stephen Osborne, co-founder of Pulp Press and founder of Geist magazine, taught Casper to typeset, and for the next ten years she made a living freelance typesetting and being a foster parent for at-risk teenagers.

== Personal life ==
Inspired by Rabbi Daniel Siegel, Casper and her first husband, Bryan Wert, converted to Judaism. Over the years, she has veered toward a spiritually informed atheism, and says, "I don't worry about defining myself. Judaism will always be part of who I am."

Claudia's second husband is James Griffin, the founder and president of Vancouver Film School. They have two sons together.

== Works ==
Casper first submitted her writing to Event magazine's creative non-fiction competition, where she shared first prize, and the Federation of BC Writers' short fiction competition, which she also won.

With the financial support of the Canada Council for the Arts, Casper wrote her first novel, The Reconstruction, about a woman who is hired to construct a life-sized model of Lucy—the hominid whose fossilized skeleton and footprints are humankind's link to the other primates in the evolutionary chain—while trying to recreate herself after separating from her husband. Casper says The Reconstruction was "sparked by a desire to explore what it meant to be a woman living today who is descended from Lucy."

After a bidding war, The Reconstruction was published in 1996 by Penguin and became a bestseller. The New York Times called it a "probing book," and The Globe and Mail said, "The writing is beautiful, with passages of dazzling poetic intensity on nearly every page." It was optioned for a film and published in the United States, the United Kingdom and Germany.

While writing her second novel, The Continuation of Love by Other Means, Casper also wrote book reviews for The Globe and Mail and The Vancouver Sun. She also published two short pieces, "Dad's Place" in Geist magazine, which also appeared in Best Canadian Stories 96, edited by Douglas Glover and published by Oberon Press in 1996, and "Victory," which appeared in Dropped Threads: What We Aren't Told alongside Margaret Atwood and Miriam Toews, edited by Carol Shields and Marjorie Anderson and published by Vintage Canada in 2001.

With friend Anne Giardini, Carol Shields' daughter, Casper created the Carol Shields Labyrinth, an interactive labyrinth website that honours Shields' life.

Casper's second novel, The Continuation of Love by Other Means, explores gender conflict through the relationship of a right-leaning father and left-wing daughter in Argentina during the Dirty War. It was published by Penguin in 2003 to critical acclaim (Quill & Quire called Casper a "brave, subtle writer") and short-listed for the Ethel Wilson BC Book Prize.

"Casper's third novel, The Mercy Journals, winner of the Philip K. Dick Award, was released in Canada and the U.S. by Arsenal Pulp Press. Mary Woodbury of eco-fiction.com wrote, "The Mercy Journals offers a view into the near future after climate change results in a far different world than the one we know today, a world in which a Mexican border horror wall comes alive, a world in which the surreal, bizarre, and beautiful begin to triumph via character redemption and hope." Christine Canfield at forewordreviews.com in a starred review wrote, "This complex tale puts global crises and personal crises hand in hand, and questions if morality can stay the same or must adapt." Casper sees her three novels as "a trio about our species: evolution, reproduction and war—light topics, every one."

She is currently co-writing a screenplay of The Reconstruction for a 3D feature film with French co-production partners, Jacqueline Farmer and Cyril Barbaçon.

Casper has taught writing for the Vancouver Manuscript Intensive, founded by Betsy Warland and at Kwantlen Polytechnic University, and was a faculty member at the 2016 Iceland Writers Retreat.

== Bibliography ==
- The Mercy Journals (Arsenal Pulp Press, 2016)
- The Reconstruction (Penguin, 1996)
- "Dad's Place". Geist magazine, and Best Canadian Stories 96 (Oberon Press, 1996)
- The Continuation of Love by Other Means (Penguin, 2003)
- "Victory". Dropped Threads: What We Aren't Told (Vintage Canada, 2001 and Canadian Content (Nelson Education, 2012))
- The Mercy Journals (Arsenal Pulp Press, 2016)
