= Shlomo Moussaieff (businessman) =

Israeli jewellery dealer and collector

- שלמה מוסאיוף
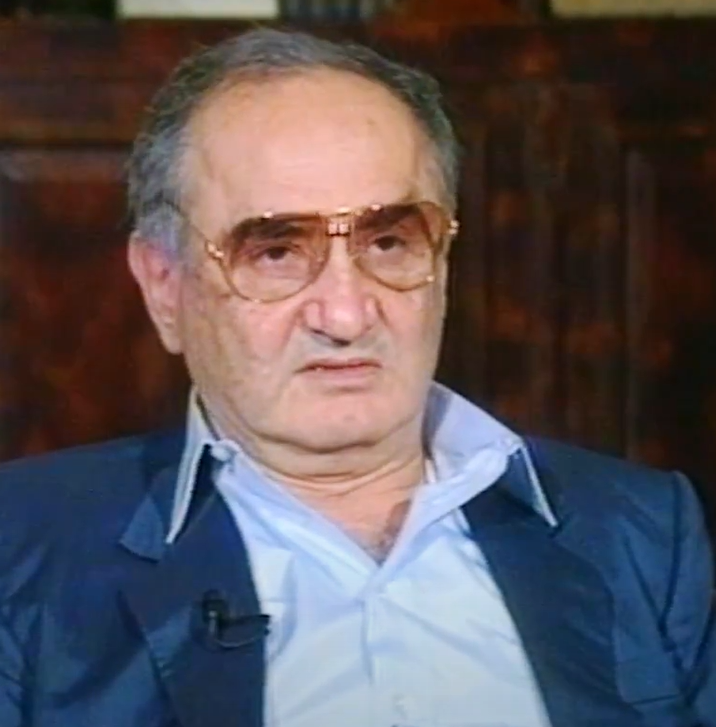
- Moussaieff in 1993
- Born: 1925; Jerusalem, Mandatory Palestine
- Died: July 1, 2015 (aged 90)
- Resting place: Jerusalem, Israel
- Occupation: Jewelry merchant
- Years active: 1950s–2015
- Organization: Moussaieff Jewellery Ltd.
- Known for: Dealer in exclusive diamonds and gemstones Biblical antiquities collector
- Spouse: Alisa
- Children: Dorrit; Tamara; Sharon
- Parent: Rehavia Moussaieff
- Relatives: Shlomo Moussaieff, grandfather
- Website: www.moussaieff-jewellers.com

Shlomo Moussaieff (Hebrew: שלמה מוסאיוף; 1925 – July 1, 2015) was an Israeli jeweler. Founder of Moussaieff Jewellers Ltd., he and his wife Alisa were ranked No. 315 on the Sunday Times Rich List 2011, with a fortune estimated at £220 million. In addition, he was regarded as one of the world's top private collectors of antiquities associated with the Bible and ancient Near East, with a collection of 60,000 artefacts.

== Biography ==
Shlomo Moussaieff was the second of 12 children of Rehavia Moussaieff, a Jerusalem-born jewellery dealer of Bukharian Jewish descent. He was named after his grandfather, Shlomo Moussaieff, a wealthy merchant who was one of the founders of the Bukharim neighbourhood in Jerusalem in 1891. Rehavia, who later traded in fine gems in Paris, introduced Shlomo to the jewellery trade at a young age. Shlomo's youngest brother, Alon, also became a Jerusalem jewellery dealer. Several of his sisters own jewellery stores: Hannah in Jerusalem's King David Hotel, Naomi in London and Aviva in Geneva. Moussaieff and his wife resided on Grosvenor Square in the Mayfair district of London. They have three daughters: Their eldest, Dorrit, is the former First Lady of Iceland and is married to the former President of Iceland, Olafur Ragnar Grimsson. Their second daughter, Tamar, works in the business. Their third daughter is Sharon.

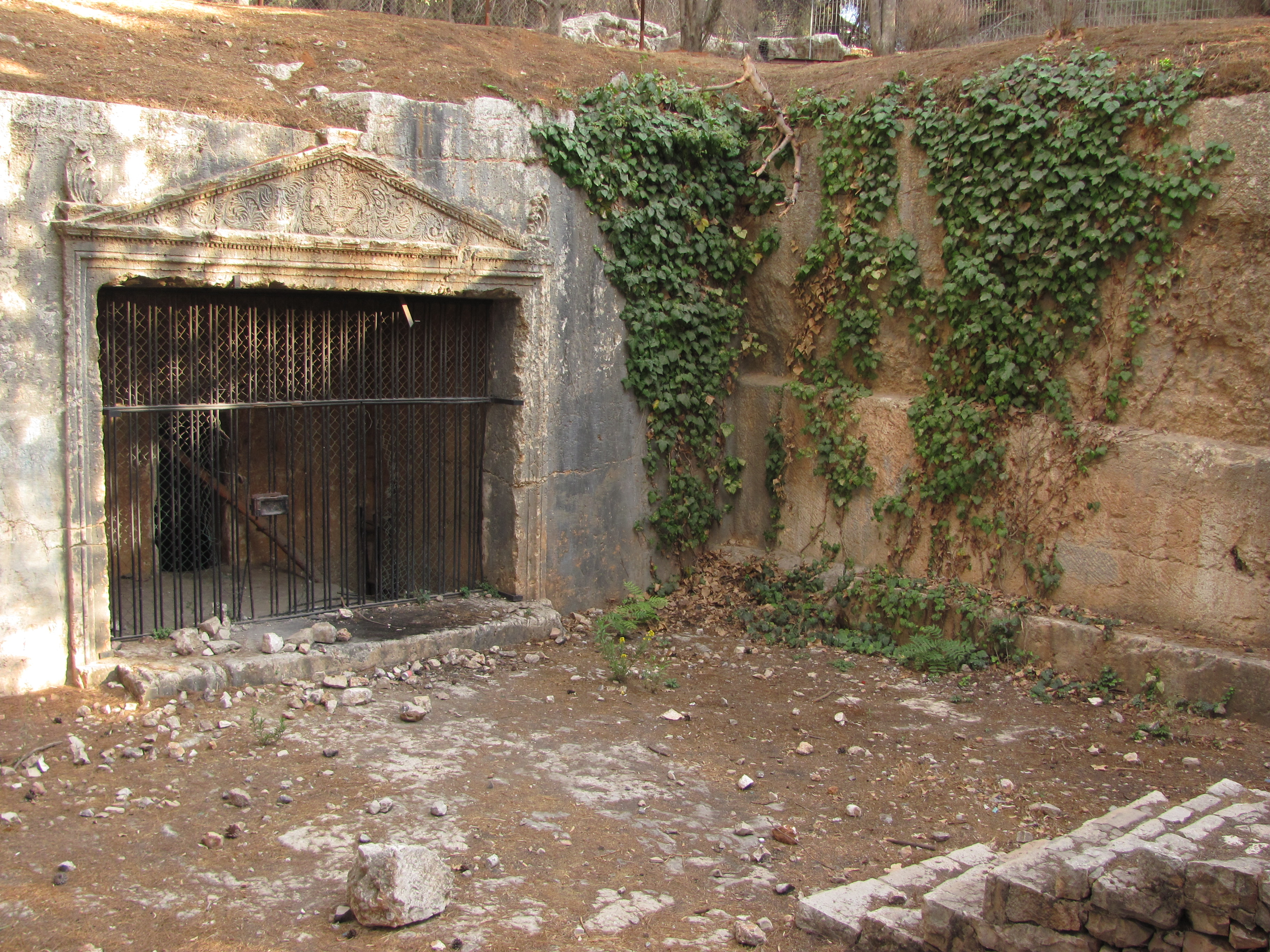
The Tombs of the Sanhedrin

His father, a strict disciplinarian, threw him out of the house at the age of 12 because he refused to apply himself to his studies. Moussaieff claims he had dyslexia and was unable to read and write. He began sleeping in synagogues, buses, and even the street, and worked for a carpenter in Sanhedria. After hours, he hung around the Second Temple-era Tombs of the Sanhedrin in the nearby park. Inside the caves, which were then open to the public, he discovered ancient coins that he sold to traders. He also carved up lead coffins and sold the lead to several traders. After British Mandatory authorities uncovered his crimes Moussaieff was sentenced to nine months in a juvenile correction institution (reform school) in Tulkarm. The penalty restored the youngster's self-confidence. He asked to learn in a madrassa, where he found it easy to learn the Koran by heart, and became familiar with Arab culture.

In 1940 Moussaieff joined the Irgun which opposed British rule in Palestine. Upon the recommendation of his Irgun commander, he enlisted in the British Army at age 17 to fight Nazi Germany during World War II. He served in Egypt, Libya, and Italy during the war. While stationed in the Egyptian desert and Livorno, Italy, he searched through synagogue genizot (treasuries) during his free time and bought old Kabbalah manuscripts and marriage contracts written by well-known rabbis. In 1947 he rejoined the Irgun to battle the Arab Legion in the Old City of Jerusalem. When the city fell to the Jordanians during the 1948 Arab-Israeli War, he was taken captive and imprisoned for one year in Transjordan. He married his wife, Alisa, an Austrian native, two weeks before he went into captivity.

== Business career ==
After his release, Moussaieff worked in his family's jewellery store and opened his own antique jewellery shop in downtown Jerusalem. He supplemented his income by smuggling "gold and antiquities from Jordan to Israel" in the 1950s. During this time he came in contact with Moshe Dayan, another confirmed antiquities smuggler, and provided Dayan with artefacts in exchange for the use of Dayan's car for transporting smuggled goods. In 1954 he was detained under suspicion of stealing 1,000 coins and other antiquities from the Hebrew University of Jerusalem. Moussaieff claimed he had "paid full price" for the items, but would not disclose the seller. He was released after his wife returned the lot to the Jerusalem District Police.

In 1963 he moved to London and opened his first jewellery shop in the lobby of the London Hilton on Park Lane. He later opened another store on London's Bond Street. Sales increased in 1967 when wealthy Arabs from Saudi Arabia and the Persian Gulf began to buy jewelry in London. He and his wife operated the business in partnership; she managed sales while he designed the jewellery. In addition to diamonds, coloured gemstones, and natural pearls, Moussaieff re-set stones and pearls that he acquired at antique jewellery auctions into new jewellery designs.

Moussaieff produced precious jewellery for international royalty and high society, including Saudi Arabia and Persian Gulf states. He spoke Arabic fluently. Moussaieff Jewellers Ltd. has two London stores and a shop at the Grand Hotel Kempinski Geneve in Switzerland. Moussaieff's clients included government figures such as Imelda Marcos and Princess Ashraf and Princess Shams of Iran, and celebrities such as, Richard Burton, Elizabeth Taylor, Stavros Niarchos, Zsa Zsa Gabor, Joan Collins, Bob Cummings, Shirley MacLaine, George Raft, Peter Sellers and Frank Sinatra. In the late 1990s he developed a following among affluent Israelis.

Moussaieff's collection included rare stones such as the Moussaieff Blue Diamond, a flawless 6.04 carat stone that Alisa purchased at a 2007 Sotheby's auction in Hong Kong for $7.98 million, setting a world record in price per carat, with a final bid of $1.32 million per carat. The Moussaieff Red Diamond, a trilliant cut, 5.11 carat red diamond purchased in 2001 or 2002, is the world's largest known red diamond.

Moussaieff retired from the business in 2004 while his wife continued to oversee sales, designs and acquisitions.

== Antiquities collection ==
Moussaieff was regarded as one of the foremost private collectors of antiquities of the Bible and ancient Near East. According to his own estimate, he owned 60,000 artefacts, specialising in ancient manuscripts and personal seals from the First and Second Temple periods.

Since he was willing to pay large sums for antiquities that proved the historical authenticity of the Bible, antiquities experts believe that some fakes and forgeries crept into in his collection. In 2004 Moussaieff testified as a victim in a forgery trial involving the James Ossuary and the Jehoash Inscription. According to a blogpost by Hershel Shanks, Moussaieff had bought two ostraca (pottery shards with text written on them) from Oded Golan, one of the defendants in the trial; these purchases were also determined by the IAA to be forgeries. In March 2012, the defendants were acquitted of the forgery charges. Moussaieff was also involved in a seven-year lawsuit filed against him by the Republic of Iraq, accusing him of stealing artefacts from ancient Nineveh after the fall of Saddam Hussein. Though Moussaieff claimed he had bought the antiquities legitimately from a Swiss dealer, he returned them all to the Iraqi government to avoid undue publicity.

Mandaic incantation bowls in the Moussaieff Collection include:

- M23
- M24
- M25
- M26
- M45
- M139
- M154
- unnumbered A
- unnumbered B

== Awards and recognition ==
Moussaieff received an honorary degree from Bar Ilan University in 2000. The university announced his death in a statement on July 1, 2015.
