= History of the Jews in Iceland =

Icelandic Jews Íslenskir Gyðingar יהודים איסלנדיים
Total population
- About 250

Regions with significant populations
- Reykjavík

Languages
- Icelandic, English, Russian, Hebrew

Religion
- Judaism

The location of Iceland (dark green) in relation to Europe

The history of the Jews in Iceland begins with the arrival of the first Jewish trader in 1625. In 2023, around 300 Jews were living in Iceland. The first rabbi to be permanently located in Iceland since 1918 moved to the country in 2018.

== History ==
From the eleventh century, Icelanders have called the Jews gyðingar, a derivative of Guð (God). The Gyðinga saga, the Saga of the Jews, was written in the thirteenth century. It is a translation of the First Book of Maccabees and fragments from the writings of Flavius Josephus.

The first Jews in Iceland were traders. Daniel Salomon, a Polish Jew who converted to Christianity, came to Iceland in 1625. In 1704, Jacob Franco, a Dutch Jew of Portuguese origin who was living in Copenhagen, was appointed to be in charge of all tobacco exports sold in Iceland and the Faroe Isles. In 1710 Abraham Levin and Abraham Cantor were given similar responsibilities. Isak, Cantor's son, took over from his father in 1731. In 1815, the Ulricha, a Jewish trade ship rented by Ruben Moses Henriques of Copenhagen, arrived in Iceland. In 1853, Iceland's parliament, the Alþingi, rejected a request by the Danish king to implement the Danish law allowing foreign Jews to reside in the country. Two years later the parliament told the king that the law would be applied to Iceland and that both Danish and foreign Jews were welcome. The Alþingi said that the Jews were enterprising merchants who did not try to lure others to their religion. However, no Jew is known to have accepted this offer.

In the late nineteenth century there were a small number of trading agents which represented firms owned by Danish Jews. In 1912, Fritz Heymann Nathan, a Danish Jew, joined with entrepreneur Carl Olsen to found Nathan & Olsen in Reykjavík. In 1917, the company moved into new headquarters, a five-story building designed by Guðjón Samúelsson, was the first in Reykjavik to be lit with electricity. After his marriage in 1917, Nathan realized it was impossible to conduct a Jewish life in Iceland and moved to Copenhagen; he sold his shares in the company in 1936.

Even after the country received home rule in 1918, Icelandic immigration policy generally followed that of Denmark's. In May 1938, Denmark closed its gates to the Austrian Jews and Iceland did the same a few weeks later. In the late 1930s, the Hilfsverein der Juden in Deutschland (the Aid Association of German Jews) wrote a report to the Auswanderberater in Reich on the possibilities of Jewish immigration to Iceland and concluded it was impossible because of the difficulty in obtaining residence permits. In addition, several Jews were expelled from Iceland, some of whom were forced to return to Germany and Austria and died in extermination camps. Icelandic authorities also offered to pay for the further expulsion of Jews to Germany if the Danish authorities would not take care of them after they had been expelled from Iceland.

Otto Weg, a Jewish refugee from Leipzig, was one of the few allowed to stay in Iceland during the war. Like other refugees, Weg took an Icelandic name when naturalized, as required by law, and adopted the name Ottó Arnaldur Magnússon. He faced significant discrimination and in Iceland was never employed as a geologist, his profession.

Two musicians of Jewish descent arrived in Iceland from Germany shortly before World War II: Robert Abraham (who later adopted the name Róbert Abraham Ottósson) and Heinz Edelstein. A third musician, Victor Urbancic, was employed in 1938 by the Reykjavík Music Society; his wife, Melitta Urbancic, was Jewish and thus they had to flee Vienna with their three children. The stories of these musicians, and their influence on the musical culture of Iceland, was told by the musicologist Árni Heimir Ingólfsson in a 2025 publication, Music at World's End.

The 1930 census listed no adherents to Judaism. The 1940 census gave their number as 9: 6 men and 3 women. In late 1940, the Jewish Telegraphic Agency reported that a group of about 50 German refugees, many Jewish, lived in Iceland, where they were required to report to the British Security Corps weekly.

== World War II ==
On 10 May 1940 British forces arrived in Reykjavík, and among them were some Jewish servicemen. They did not find a synagogue but eventually did find other Jews who had arrived earlier: Hendrik Ottóson's wife, stepson, and mother-in-law were Jewish, and he contacted the British forces to ask whether any Jewish servicemen wanted to celebrate Jewish holidays.

On Yom Kippur of that year (October 11–12), 25 Jewish soldiers from Britain, Scotland, and Canada gathered with eight Jewish refugees from Germany and Austria. Ottósson, who knew Hebrew, served as their Shammash. The Icelandic authorities had offered a chapel in Reykjavík's old cemetery, but Ottósson found the suggestion insulting and rented a hall from the Good Templars' Lodge. Alfred Conway (formerly Alfred Cohen), a cantor from Leeds, sang the Kol Nidre prayer, and the service was chiefly led by an Anglican chaplain, who read from a Hebrew/English prayer book. The group broke the fast at a Reykjavik hotel and, over dinner, the country's first Jewish congregation in Iceland was formally established. The first bar mitzvah in Iceland took place on Shabbat Pesach, 1941.

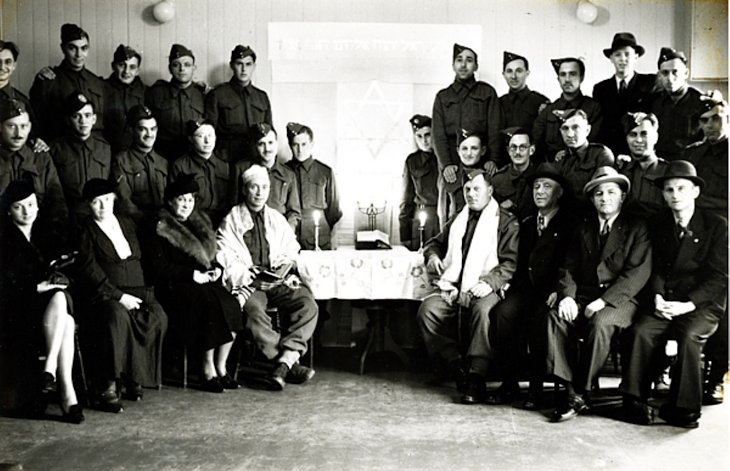
Photograph of British, Scottish, and Canadian servicemen; Hendrik Ottósson; Jewish refugees who celebrated Yom Kippur together in Reykjavik, Iceland. Source: Ontario Jewish Archives

The arrival of U.S. forces brought more frequent Jewish communal events to Iceland, initially organized by Jewish soldiers and then overseen by American military chaplains and supported by the National Jewish Welfare Board. In the fall of 1941, a weekly U.S. military newspaper noted that Kabbalat Shabbat services were held each Friday near the American Consulate. Rabbi Julius Amos Leibert, an Army Chaplain educated at Reform seminary HUC-JIR, conducted High Holiday services for a congregation of more than 800 in 1942 and, on his way back to Jefferson Barracks Military Post, where he was stationed, he held services for Jewish soldiers in Greenland and Labrador. Other military chaplains serving the country during World War II included JTS-trained Rabbi Mayer Abramowitz, HUC-JIR-educated Rabbi William H. Rosenblatt, and Rabbi Harold Gordon, who served the North Atlantic Air Transport Command.

A 1944 Rosh Hashana service at the Naval Air Station Keflavik was attended by 500 Jews and a Torah scroll was flown in from the United States. In 1944, around 2,000 of 70,000 American servicemen in Iceland were Jewish, which warranted a rabbi stationed in Keflavík. There was an active Jewish congregation at the Naval Air Station until the U.S. left the base in 2006.

== After the war ==
Though Iceland became independent from Denmark in 1944, the new country was profoundly xenophobic, antisemitic, and concerned with racial purity. As a result, most Jews kept a low profile and tried to attract as little attention as possible. Most were not religious and kept to themselves. In some cases, Jews hid their origins and past from family and acquaintances.

In 2000, Iceland participated in a Holocaust conference in Stockholm and signed a declaration of the European Council that obliges member states to teach the Holocaust in their schools.

== Jews in Iceland today ==
In 2021, the government formally recognized Judaism as an official religion, recognizing Jewish life cycle events, supporting a Jewish cemetery, and making the Jewish community one to which Icelanders can designate their religious tax payments. As of 2023, around 300 Jews are living in Iceland.

=== Jewish life in Reykjavik ===
In the 1980s and 1990s, Jewish expats Mike Levin and Hope Knútsson coordinated some Jewish communal activities, taking place in a local community center and in the basement of Hallgrímskirkja, a famous church in Iceland. Until its closure in 2006, U.S. Naval Air Station Keflavik occasionally provided Jewish chaplains.

Between 2011 and 2018, Chabad sent young student rabbis to Iceland for major holidays, usually Passover and the High Holy Days. When Rabbi Berel Pewzner led holiday services in 2011, it marked the first formal services with a rabbi and a Torah scroll held in the city since the end of World War II, according to community members. According to the rabbi, it was the first time some of them had heard a shofar. Pewzner and his brother Naftoli served the community until 2017.

=== Jewish Community Iceland Beit Tovah Chabad ===
In 2018, Rabbi Avi Feldman and Mushky Feldman established a permanent Chabad-Lubavitch house in Reykjavik. In December 2018, the couple held the country's first menorah lighting in the city center, with Ólafur Ragnar Grímsson and Dorrit Moussaieff in attendance.

In 2020, Feldman's Chabad received its own commissioned Torah scroll and held a Hachnasat Sefer Torah in downtown Reykjavík. That year, Feldman also helped organize the country's first Holocaust memorial service.

Avi Feldman is also a mashgiach with his own hechsher, which he has used to certify local products.

In 2024, the Jewish Community Iceland Beit Tovah Chabad had purchased a property to be renovated to serve as a Jewish community center.

In July 2026, the community opened the Beit Shvidler Jewish Center of Iceland, the country's first permanent Jewish community center. The center, situated in a newly renovated, 9,000-square-foot building in downtown Reykjavík, includes a synagogue, seminar room, kosher shop, community kitchen, youth center, library lounge, security center, and a mikveh.

=== Recent controversies ===
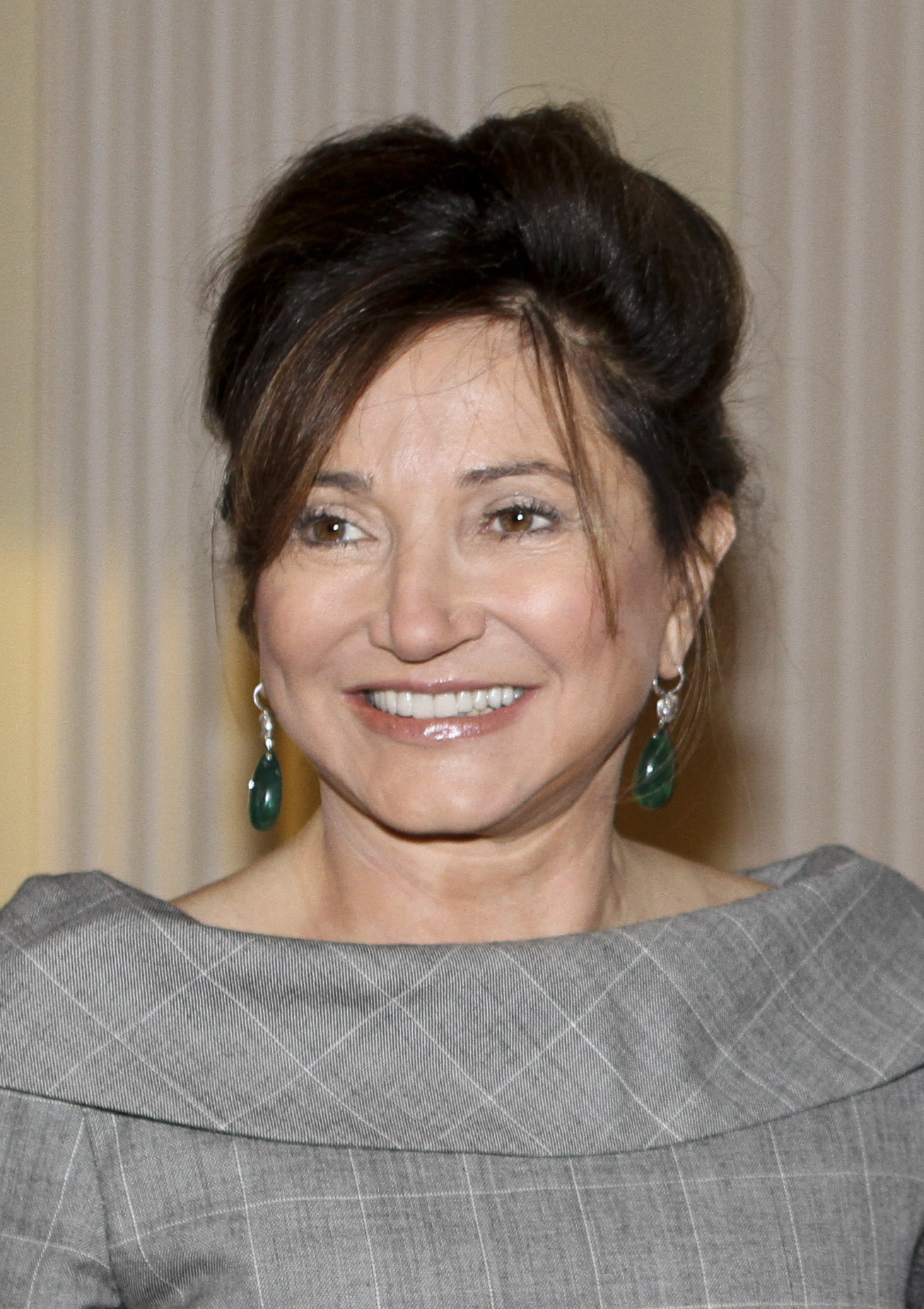
Former First Lady Dorrit Moussaieff

Dorrit Moussaieff, former First Lady of Iceland (2003–2016), is an Israeli Bukharan Jew born in Jerusalem. Moussaeiff has been the target of antisemitism in Iceland, including attacks from Ástþór Magnússon Wium.

After the 2008 Icelandic financial crisis, scholar Vilhjálmur Örn Vilhjálmsson found increased public attacks on Jewish Icelanders, blaming them for the crisis.

Since 1943, state broadcaster RÚV has annually broadcast Hallgrímur Pétursson's Passiusalmar ("Hymns of the Passion") during Lent, a tradition initiated at the urging of Sigurbjörn Einarsson. For each of the fifty days leading up to Easter, an Icelander reads one verse of the hymns. In 2012, Rabbi Abraham Cooper of the Simon Wiesenthal Center attempted and failed to stop this practice, arguing that their many negative references to Jews reinforced antisemitic hatred. However, RÚV director Páll Magnússon rejected the request, telling Cooper to "bear in mind that the hymns are written 350 years ago and they describe the poet's feelings about events that supposedly took place around 2000 years ago." Vilhjálmur Örn Vilhjálmsson has commented that the episode revealed that "no Icelandic researcher on Pétursson's poetry had ever considered whether the Passiusalmar were perhaps not a uniquely Icelandic phenomenon," but representative of European antisemitism prevalent at the time of their writing.

In 2018, legislator Silja Dögg Gunnarsdótir introduced a bill banning non-medical circumcision, and therefore brit milah, in the Alþingi, Iceland's parliament. It was called an attack on religious freedom by Jewish and Islamic groups. The bill, endorsed by 500 of the country's physicians, gathered the support of all political parties in Iceland, based on the argument that it was a defense of children's rights. The bill also faced major opposition, however. The Icelandic Nurses' Association and the country's director of health, as well as the Icelandic Child Protection Agency, all opposed the bill, arguing that the risk that the procedure would continue illegally and pose greater harms to children and that circumcised boys and men might face anti-religious discrimination. The Judicial Affairs and Education Committee recommended the bill's dismissal several months after its introduction and the matter was dropped.

== See also ==
- Demographics of Iceland
- History of the Jews in Denmark
- Iceland–Israel relations
- Jews in Greenland
- History of the Jews in Sweden
- History of the Jews in Finland
