= List of state visits made and received by Harald V =

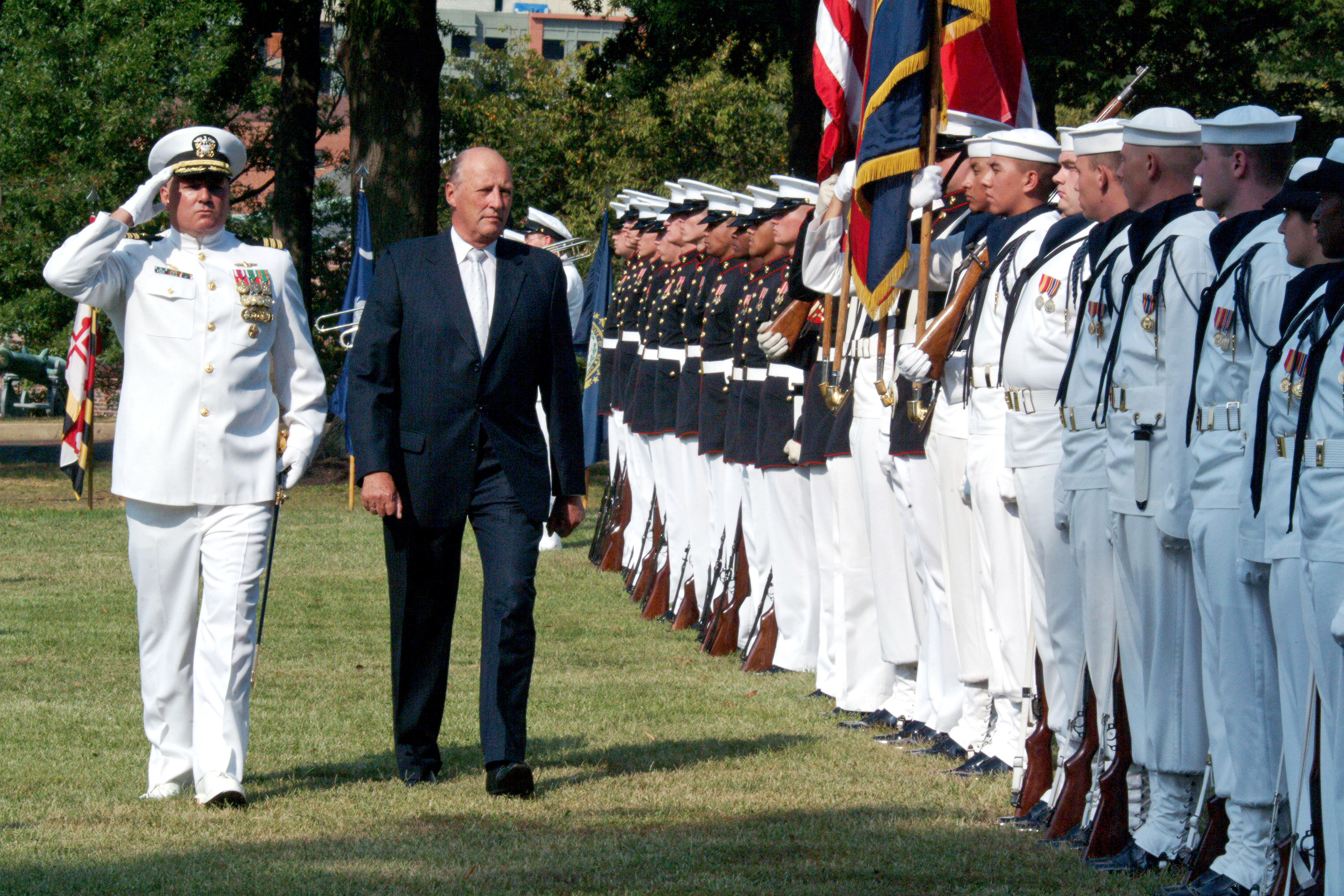
King Harald V inspects an honour guard during an official visit (not a state visit) to the United States.

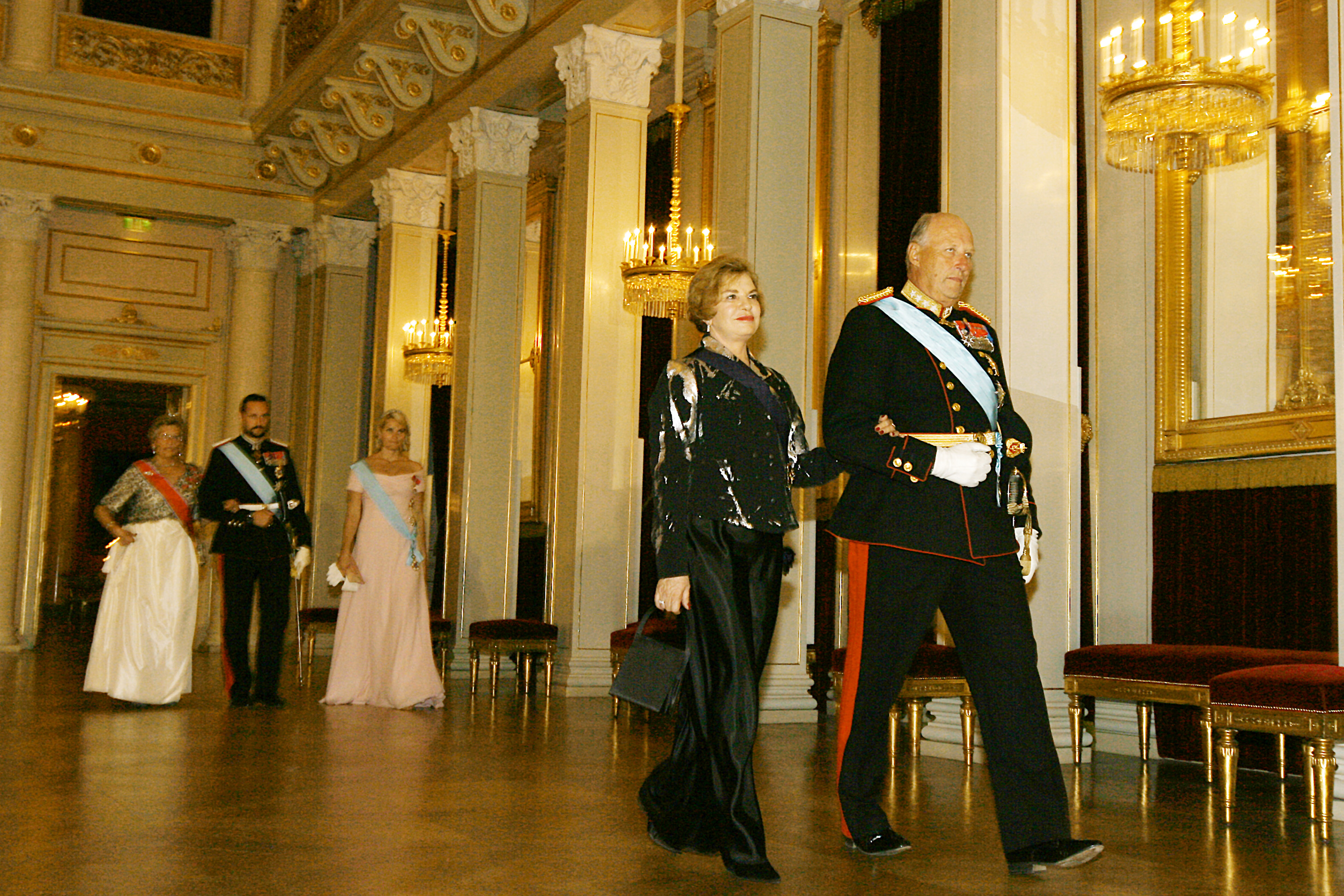
King Harald V escorts the first lady of Brazil Marisa Silva to a state dinner in the Royal Palace, Oslo, on their return visit in 2007. Princess Astrid, Crown Prince Haakon and Crown Princess Mette-Marit in the background.

Below is a complete list of state visits made and received by Harald V of Norway during his reign from 1991 to 2026. Four state visits were usually made each year: two visits by King Harald and Queen Sonja to a foreign head of state and two visits by another head of state to Norway. The number of state visits has increased greatly during the 1900s. King Haakon VII reigned for 52 years from 1905 and made a total of 13 state visits to foreign countries. King Harald V had as of 2026 reigned for 35 years and had conducted over 60 state visits.

== State visits made by Harald V ==
Date(s)	Country	Details
28–30 October 1991	Denmark	Visiting Queen Margrethe II and Prince Henrik
12–14 May 1992	Sweden	Visiting King Carl XVI Gustaf and Queen Silvia
7–9 September 1992	Iceland	Visiting President Vigdís Finnbogadóttir
23-25 March 1993	Finland	Visiting President Mauno Koivisto
18–21 April 1994	Germany	Visiting President Richard von Weizsäcker and Marianne von Weizsäcker
6–9 July 1994	United Kingdom	Visiting Queen Elizabeth II and Prince Philip
25–28 April 1995	Spain	Visiting King Juan Carlos and Queen Sofia
30–31 October 1995	United States of America	Visiting President Bill Clinton and Hillary Clinton
15–17 April 1996	the Netherlands	Visiting Queen Beatrix and Prince Claus
18–19 April 1996	Grand Duchy of Luxembourg	Visiting Grand Duke Jean and Grand Duchess Josephine-Charlotte
28–31 August 1996	Austria	Visiting President Thomas Klestil
14–16 October 1996	Poland	Visiting President Aleksander Kwaśniewski and Jolanta Kwaśniewska
18–20 March 1997	Czech Republic	Visiting President Václav Havel and Dagmar Havlová
23–30 October 1997	China	Visiting President Jiāng Zémín and Wang Yeping
22–28 February 1998	South Africa	Visiting President Nelson Mandela
25–30 May 1998	Russian Federation	Visiting President Boris Yeltsin and Naina Yeltsina
31 August–1 September 1998	Estonia	Visiting President Lennart Meri and Helle Meri
2–3 September 1998	Latvia	Visiting President Guntis Ulmanis and Aina Ulmane
4–5 September 1998	Lithuania	Visiting President Valdas Adamkus and Alma Adamkus
20–22 September 1999	Romania	Visiting President Emil Constantinescu and Nadina Ileana Constantinescu
1–3 March 2000	French Republic	Visiting President Jacques Chirac and Bernadette Chirac
25–31 March 2001	Japan	Visiting Emperor Akihito and Empress Michiko
23–25 October 2001	Italy	Visiting President Carlo Azeglio Ciampi and Franca Ciampi
25 October 2001	State of the Vatican City	Visiting Pope John Paul II
6–11 May 2002	Canada	Visiting Governor General Adrienne Clarkson and John Ralston Saul
8–10 October 2002	Hungary	Visiting President Ferenc Mádl and Dalma Mádl
20–22 June 2003	Belgium	Visiting King Albert II and Queen Paola
7–11 October 2003	Brazil	Visiting President Luiz Inácio Lula da Silva and Marisa Letícia Lula da Silva
8–10 June 2004	Greece	Visiting President Konstantinos Stephanopoulos
28–29 October 2004	Singapore	Visiting President Sellapan Rama Nathan and Urmila Nandey
1–5 November 2004	Vietnam	Visiting President Trần Đức Lương
5–6 April 2006	Switzerland	Visiting President Moritz Leuenberger
18–20 September 2006	Ireland	Visiting President Mary McAleese and Martin McAleese
5–7 June 2007	Finland	Visiting President Tarja Halonen and Pentti Arajärvi
15–17 October 2007	Germany	Visiting President Horst Köhler and Eva Bohnet
27–29 May 2008	Portugal	Visiting President Aníbal Cavaco Silva and Maria Cavaco Silva
24–27 November 2009	South Africa	Visiting President Jacob Zuma
26–28 October 2010	Slovakia	Visiting President Ivan Gašparovič and Silvia Gašparovičová
9–10 May 2011	Slovenia	Visiting President Danilo Türk and Barbara Türk
12–13 May 2011	Croatia	Visiting President Ivo Josipović and Tatjana Josipović
9–11 May 2012	Poland	Visiting President Bronisław Komorowski and Anna Komorowska
5–7 November 2013	Turkey	Visiting President Abdullah Gül and Mrs. Hayrünnisa Gül
1–5 December 2014	Myanmar	Visiting President Thein Sein
23–27 February 2015	Australia	Visiting Governor General Sir Peter Cosgrove and Lady Hazel Cosgrove
6–8 April 2016	Italy	Visiting President Sergio Mattarella
6–8 March 2018	Argentina	Visiting President Mauricio Macri and Juliana Awada
11–19 October 2018	China	Visiting President Xi Jinping and Peng Liyuan
26–31 March 2019	Chile	Visiting President Sebastián Piñera and Cecilia Morel
2–4 March 2020	Jordan	Visiting King Abdullah II of Jordan and Queen Rania of Jordan
11 September 2022	Denmark	Visiting Queen Margrethe II
15–16 June 2023	Denmark	Visiting Queen Margrethe II
6–9 February 2026	Italy	Visiting President Sergio Mattarella
24–26 February 2026	Spain	Visiting King Felipe VI and Queen Letizia

== State visits received by Harald V ==
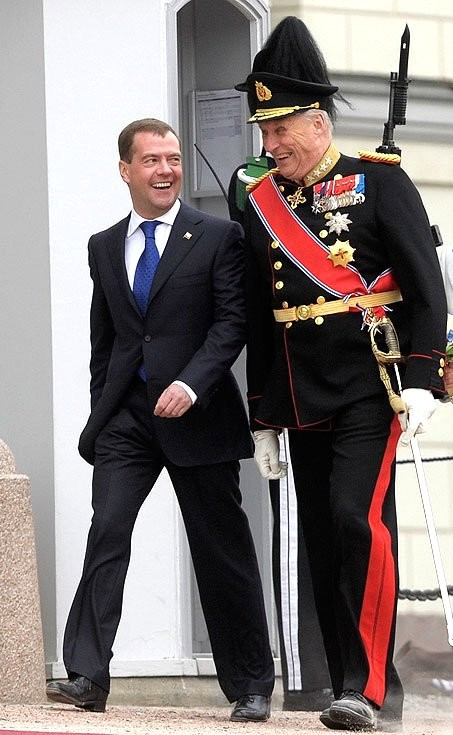
King Harald V and Dmitry Medvedev, President of Russia outside the Royal Palace, Oslo.

Date(s)		Country	Details
13–15 October	1992	Denmark	visited by Queen Margrethe II and Prince Henrik
7–9 June	1993	Sweden	visited by King Carl XVI Gustaf and Queen Silvia
26–29 October	1993	Iceland	visited by President Vigdís Finnbogadóttir
18–21 October	1994	Finland	visited by President Martti Ahtisaari and Eeva Ahtisaari
14–16 March	1995	Poland	visited by President Lech Wałęsa and Danuta Wałęsa
29–30 May	1995	Austria	visited by President Thomas Klestil
25–26 March	1996	Russia	visited by President Boris Yeltsin and Naina Jeltsina
27–29 June	1996	China	visited by President Jiang Zemin and Wang Yeping
11–14 February	1997	Iceland	visited by President Ólafur R. Grimsson and Guðrún Katrín Þorbergsdóttir
28–30 April	1997	Belgium	visited by King Albert II and Queen Paola
17–19 June	1998	Germany	visited by President Roman Herzog and Christiane Herzog
16–17 March	1999	South Africa	visited by President Nelson Mandela and Graça Machel
22–24 March	1999	Hungary	visited by President Árpád Göncz and Zsuzsanna Göncz
1 November	1999	United States	visited by President Bill Clinton
10–12 April	2000	Jordan	visited by King Abdullah II and Queen Rania
20–21 September	2000	Latvia	visited by President Vaira Vīķe-Freiberga and Imants Freiberg
25–26 October	2000	Finland	visited by President Tarja Halonen and Pentti Arajärvi
30 May–1 June	2001	United Kingdom	visited by Queen Elizabeth II and Prince Philip
10–11 April	2002	Estonia	visited by President Arnold Rüütel and Ingrid Rüütel
12 November	2002	Russia	visited by President Vladimir Putin
16–17 September	2003	Poland	visited by President Aleksander Kwaśniewski and Jolanta Kwaśniewska
3–5 February	2004	Portugal	visited by President Jorge Sampaio and Maria José Ritta
21–23 September	2004	Italy	visited by President Carlo Azeglio Ciampi and Franca Ciampi
10–13 May	2005	Japan	visited by Emperor Akihito and Empress Michiko
6–8 June	2006	Spain	visited by King Juan Carlos and Queen Sofia
29–31 August	2006	Bulgaria	visited by President Georgi Parvanov and Zorka Parvanova
17–19 April	2007	Austria	visited by President Heinz Fischer and Margit Fischer
13–14 September	2007	Brazil	visited by President Luiz Inácio Lula da Silva and Marisa Letícia da Silva
5–6 June	2008	Vietnam	visited by President Nguyễn Minh Triết and Mrs. Tran Thi Kim Chi
14–16 October	2008	Ireland	visited by President Mary McAleese and Dr. Martin McAleese
28–30 April	2009	Canada	visited by Governor-General Michaëlle Jean and Mr. Jean-Daniel Lafond
26–27 April	2010	Russia	visited by President Dmitry Medvedev and Mrs. Svetlana Medvedeva
1–3 May	2010	Netherlands	visited by Queen Beatrix
14–15 October	2010	Switzerland	visited by President Doris Leuthard and Mr. Roland Hausin
5–6 April	2011	Lithuania	visited by President Dalia Grybauskaitė
30 May–1 June	2011	Luxembourg	visited by Grand Duke Henri and Grand Duchess Maria Teresa
31 August–1 September	2011	South Africa	visited by President Jacob Zuma and Mrs. Tobeka Zuma
10–12 October	2012	Finland	visited by President Sauli Niinistö and Mrs. Jenni Haukio
12–13 May	2014	Israel	visited by President Shimon Peres
11–13 June	2014	Germany	visited by President Joachim Gauck and Ms Daniela Schadt
2 September	2014	Estonia	visited by President Toomas Hendrik Ilves
13–14 October	2014	India	visited by President Pranab Mukherjee, accompanied by his daughter Sharmistha Mukherjee
18–19 March	2015	Latvia	visited by President Andris Bērziņš
23–25 May	2016	Poland	visited by President Andrzej Duda and Mrs. Agata Kornhauser-Duda
10–12 October	2016	Singapore	visited by President Tony Tan and Mrs. Mary Chee Bee Kiang
21–22 March	2017	Iceland	visited by President Guðni Th. Jóhannesson and Mrs. Eliza Reid
4–6 June	2018	Slovakia	visited by President Andrej Kiska
11–13 June	2019	South Korea	visited by President Moon Jae-in and Mrs. Kim Jung-sook
6–7 November	2019	Slovenia	visited by President Borut Pahor
9–11 November	2021	Netherlands	visited by King Willem-Alexander and Queen Maxima
11–12 May	2023	Italy	visited by President Sergio Mattarella and his daughter Laura Mattarella
13–14 February	2024	Tanzania	visited by President Samia Suluhu Hassan
6–8 May	2024	Moldova	visited by President Maia Sandu
14–15 May	2024	Denmark	visited by King Frederik X and Queen Mary
8–10 April	2025	Iceland	visited by President Halla Tómasdóttir and Mr. Björn Skúlason
24–26 March	2026	Belgium	visited by King Philippe and Queen Mathilde

== See also ==
- List of state visits made and received by Haakon VII
- List of state visits made and received by Olav V

== Sources ==
- Royal House list of state visits
