= The Capilano Review =

Canadian tri-annual literary magazine

- Categories: Literary magazine, Canadian culture
- Frequency: 3 issues per year
- Founded: 1972
- Company: Capilano Review Contemporary Arts Society
- Country: Canada
- Based in: Vancouver, British Columbia, Canada
- Language: Canadian English
- Website: thecapilanoreview.com
- ISSN: 0315-3754
- OCLC: 1947161

The Capilano Review (TCR) is a Canadian tri-annual literary magazine located and published in Vancouver, British Columbia, Canada. A member of the Canadian Magazine Publishers Association, Magazine Association of BC, and the Alliance for Arts and Culture, it publishes avant-garde experimental poetry, visual art, interviews, and essays. The magazine features works by emerging and established Canadian and international writers and artists.

The Capilano Review also publishes the web folio ti-TCR and the digital chapbook series SMALL CAPS. The magazine hosts an annual Writer-in-Residence, as well as regular readings, workshops, panels, and contests throughout the year.

The Capilano Review was founded in 1972 by Pierre Coupey at Capilano College.
