= Iceland–Israel relations =

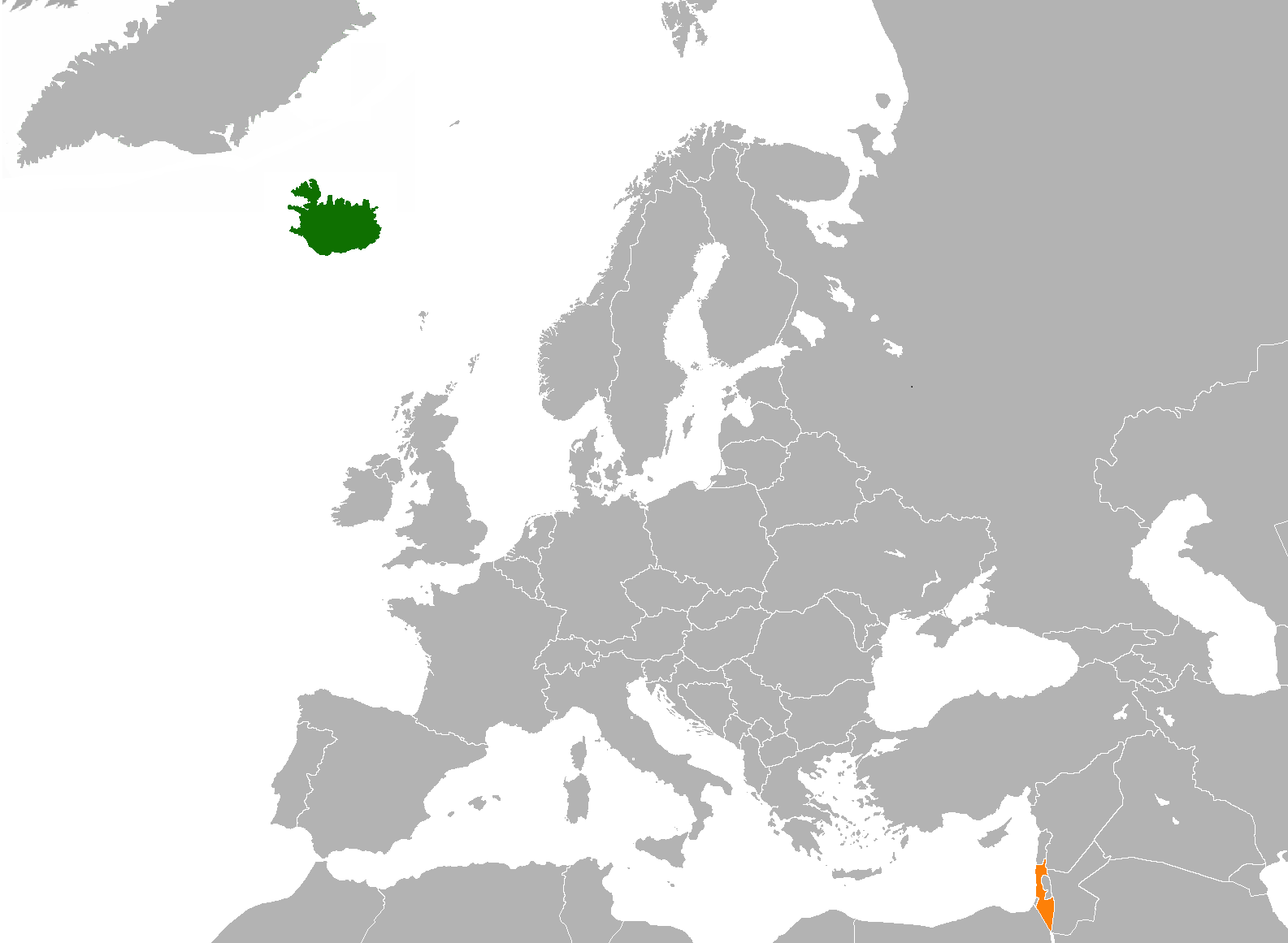
- Iceland: Israel

Iceland–Israel relations refers to the diplomatic relations between Iceland and the State of Israel. Both nations are members of the Organisation for Economic Co-operation and Development, the World Trade Organization and the United Nations.

== History ==
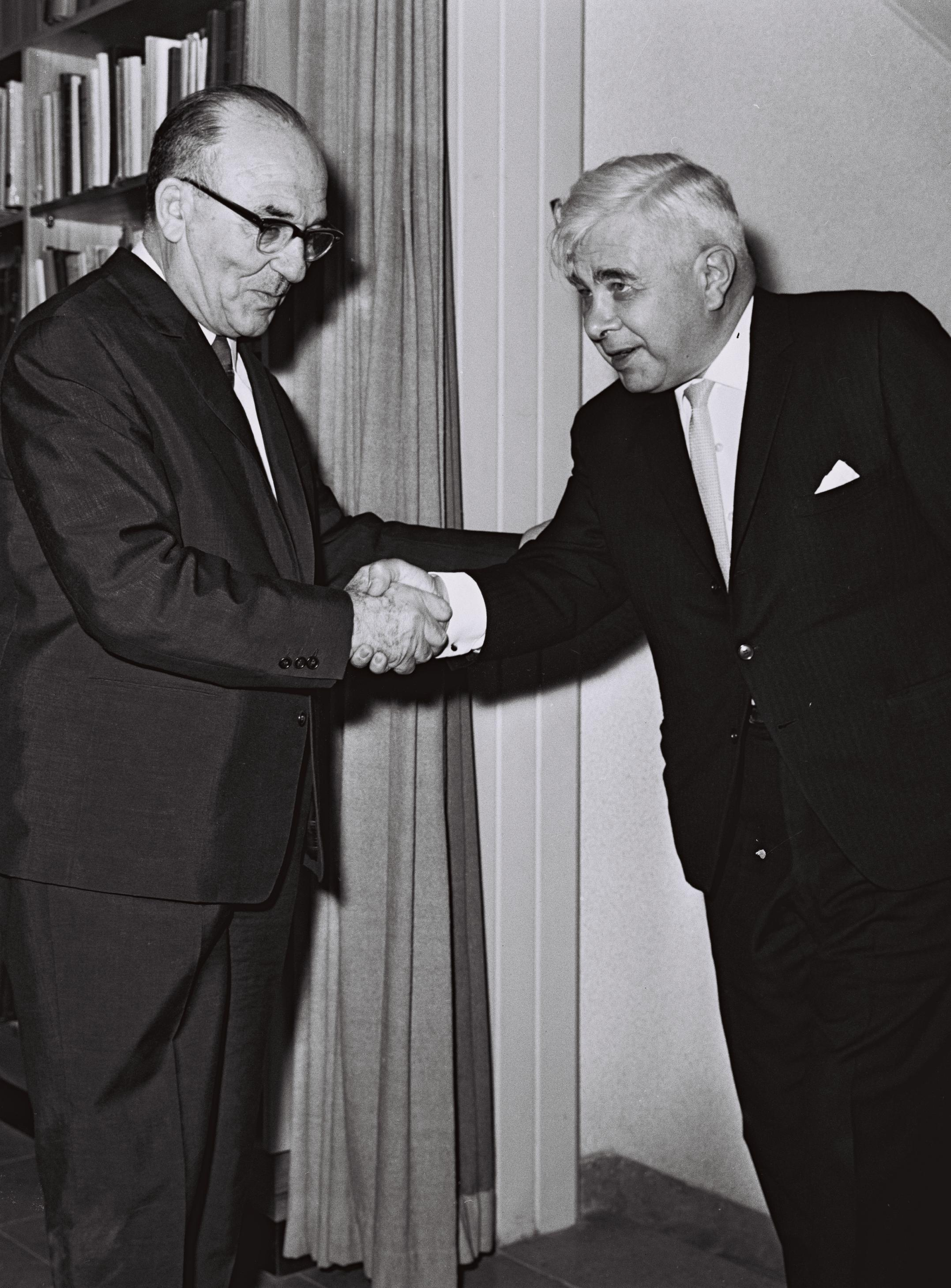
Israeli prime minister Levi Eshkol greeting Icelandic prime minister Bjarni Benediktsson in Jerusalem, 1964.

=== Early relations ===
The first official relations between modern Iceland and Israel took place on 29 November 1947 when Iceland voted in favor for the Partition of Palestine which led to the creation of the State of Israel. In May 1948 Iceland recognized the State of Israel and established diplomatic relations.

In September 1962, Israeli prime minister David Ben-Gurion traveled to Iceland on an official visit and met with Icelandic prime minister Ólafur Thors. In November 1964, Icelandic prime minister Bjarni Benediktsson paid a visit to Israel and met with Israeli prime minister Levi Eshkol. In May 1966, Icelandic president Ásgeir Ásgeirsson paid an official visit to Israel and became the first foreign head of state to address the Knesset. Ásgeirsson also cut the ribbon during the opening of a road named "Iceland Street" in Jerusalem.

In September 1992, Israel and the European Free Trade Association (which includes Iceland) signed a free trade agreement.

=== Two-state solution ===
Since the 1990s, Iceland has been a proponent of independence for nations and territories wishing to become independent. The Icelandic government has advocated for a peaceful resolution to the Israeli-Palestinian conflict and has called for international recognition of the State of Palestine. On 30 April 2002 the Althing (Parliament of Iceland) adopted a Parliamentary Resolution where it was demanded “that peace negotiations on the establishment of an independent State of Palestine and the security of the State of Israel within internationally recognised borders should begin”. As a results of this position by the Icelandic government, Israel has expressed its frustration with Iceland.

In 2010, Iceland expressed its condemnation at the United Nations against Israel's raid of the Gaza flotilla and Israel's attack on the Gaza Strip. In November 2011, the Althing approved a resolution recognizing an independent and sovereign State of Palestine within the pre-1967 Six-Day War borders becoming the first western European nation to do so.

In September 2015, the Icelandic capital of Reykjavík voted in favor "of a general boycott of Israeli goods as long as the occupation of the Palestinian territories continues." This was criticized by the Icelandic government. Immediately, the Icelandic Ministry of Foreign Affairs declared that the "decision of Reykjavík was not in line with Iceland's foreign policy nor does it reflect on Iceland's relations with the State of Israel." Within a week, Reykjavik mayor Dagur Eggertsson amended the proposal that the boycott would apply only to products from Israeli settlements.

=== Controversies ===
In 1991, Ephraim Zuroff attempted to get the Icelandic government to extradite Evald Mikson, an Estonian Nazi war criminal who signed off on the death warrants of 30 Estonian Jews. The Icelandic government refused to do so. However, they opened an investigation into Mikson in 1993. Mikson died before the conclusion of the investigation. In 2004, the Estonian International Commission for Investigation of Crimes Against Humanity found that Mikson had signed the death warrants of 30 Jews.

During the Eurovision Song Contest 2019, held in Tel Aviv, Icelandic participants Hatari held up scarves with the Palestinian flag on them during the televote. The Icelandic Association of Composers and Lyricists (FTT), which represents artists in Iceland, told its members in a statement to not participate in the Eurovision Song Contest 2024 unless Israel is removed from the competition, on the same grounds as Russia was in the last competition, due to Israel's conduct in the Gaza war. FTT also urged the Icelandic National Broadcaster (RÚV) to withdraw from the competition unless Israel is denied participation on the same grounds as Russia was due to its invasion of Ukraine.

== Tourism ==
A visa is not required for Israeli passport holders visiting Iceland for a short-term (90 days) tourism purpose. It was reported in 2017 that Israeli tourists account for 33 thousand guest nights in Icelandic accommodations with a vast majority during the summer months. While in 2008 only 1,255 visited Iceland, in 2018 about the number raised till around 5,800.

== State visits ==
Presidential and prime ministerial visits from Iceland to Israel

- Prime Minister Bjarni Benediktsson (1964)
- President Ásgeir Ásgeirsson (1966)
- Prime Minister Davíð Oddsson (1992)

Prime Ministerial visits from Israel to Iceland

- Prime Minister David Ben-Gurion (1962)

== Diplomatic missions ==
- Iceland is accredited to Israel directly from the Ministry of Foreign Affairs and maintains an honorary consulate in Tel Aviv.
- Israel is accredited to Iceland from its embassy in Oslo, Norway and maintains an honorary consulate in Reykjavík.

== See also ==
- Dorrit Moussaieff
- History of the Jews in Iceland
