= Iceland Writers Retreat =

Event for writers in Reykjavík, Iceland

The Iceland Writers Retreat is a one-week international event for writers that takes place in Reykjavík, Iceland.

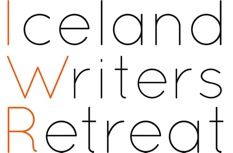
The Iceland Writers Retreat was founded in 2014 by Eliza Reid (Iceland) and Erica Jacobs Green (U.S.).

== History ==
The Iceland Writers Retreat (IWR) was founded in 2014 by Eliza Reid, then the First Lady of Iceland, and Erica Jacobs Green, of the United States. It has been held annually since 2014 in Reykjavík, Iceland. Iceland is known for its literary tradition, and Reykjavík is the world’s first non-native English speaking UNESCO City of Literature. The Iceland Writers Retreat was named one of the world's best writers' retreats in The Sydney Morning Herald. Spring 2016 marked the third annual Iceland Writers Retreat, taking place 13–17 April 2016. The fourth event was hosted from 5–9 April 2017, with the fifth taking place 11-15 April 2018. The sixth annual Retreat is scheduled for 3-7 April, 2019.

== Schedule ==
The retreat is an international gathering, bringing together authors from many different countries. The Retreat consists of several small-group writing workshops led by acclaimed authors from around the world. There are opportunities to explore Iceland between workshops, which introduce participants to Iceland's rich literary tradition and beautiful landscapes. The Retreat includes Q & A Panels with all faculty, and social events to allow participants to network with an international group of writers.

== Funding ==
The retreat's founding sponsor is Icelandair. It is also supported by the Icelandic Ministry of Education, Science and Culture, Reykjavík UNESCO City of Literature, the City of Reykjavík, the US Embassy in Iceland, and the Icelandic Literature Center.

=== Featured authors ===
- 2014: Randy Boyagoda, Joseph Boyden, Geraldine Brooks, Andrew Evans, Susan Orlean, Iain Reid, James Scudamore, Sara Wheeler
- 2015: Alison Pick, Marcello Di Cintio, Adam Gopnik, Barbara Kingsolver, Ruth Reichl, Taiye Selasi, Sjón, Linn Ullmann, John Vaillant
- 2016: Cheryl Strayed, Elina Hirvonen, Mark Kurlansky, Vincent Lam, Neel Mukherjee, Miriam Toews, Adelle Waldman, Andrew Westoll, Kate Williams, Gerður Kristný
- 2017: Bret Anthony Johnston, Claudia Casper, David Lebovitz, Meg Wolitzer, Nadifa Mohamed, Paul Murray, Sara Gruen, Vilborg Davíðsdóttir, Auður Ava Ólafsdóttir, Carsten Jensen, Chris Cleave, Esi Edugyan, Madeleine Thien
- 2018: Adania Shibli, Andri Snær Magnason, Craig Davidson, Gwendoline Riley, Hallgrímur Helgason, Lauren Groff, Lina Wolff, Pamela Paul, Rory Maclean, Susan Shreve, Terry Fallis.

Icelandic authors who have participated in the IWR through presentations and readings include: Einar Kárason, Ari Trausti Guðmundsson, Ragna Sigurðardóttir, Guðni Th. Jóhannesson, Jónína Leósdóttir, Andri Snær Magnason, Gerður Kristný, Hallgrímur Helgason, Sigurlín Bjarney Gísladóttir, Jón Gnarr, Sigurbjörg Thrastardóttir, and Yrsa Sigurðardóttir.
