= List of state visits made and received by Olav V =

Below is a complete list of state visits made and received by Olav V of Norway during his reign from 1957 to 1991. A state visit is a formal visit by one head of state to another country, at the invitation of the other country's head of state. State visits are the highest form of diplomatic contact between two states, and are marked by major ceremonial and diplomatic formality. As such this list might give an indication to the foreign relations of Norway during this period.

== State visits made by Olav V ==
| Date(s) | Country | Details |
|---|---|---|
| 11–13 September 1958 | Denmark | Visiting King Frederik IX and Queen Ingrid |
| 23–25 April 1959 | Sweden | Visiting King Gustaf VI Adolf and Queen Louise |
| 31 May – 2 June 1961 | Iceland | Visiting President Ásgeir Ásgeirsson |
| 5–7 July 1961 | Finland | Visiting President Urho Kekkonen |
| 26–28 September 1962 | France | Visiting President Charles de Gaulle |
| 16–18 October 1962 | United Kingdom | Visiting Queen Elizabeth II and Prince Philip. This state visit was made to Scotland in order to express gratitude for the Scottish people's help during World War II. |
| 9–11 September 1964 | Netherlands | Visiting Queen Juliana and Prince Bernhard |
| 14–15 September 1964 | Luxembourg | Visiting Grand Duchess Charlotte and Prince Felix |
| 21–23 September 1964 | Belgium | Visiting King Baudouin I and Queen Fabiola |
| 7–14 January 1965 | Iran | Visiting Shah Mohammad Reza Pahlavi and Empress Farah Pahlavi |
| 15–23 January 1965 | Thailand | Visiting King Bhumibol Adulyadej and Queen Sirikit |
| 10–17 January 1966 | Ethiopia | Visiting Emperor Haile Selassie I |
| 5–9 September 1966 | Yugoslavia | Visiting President Josip Broz Tito |
| 12–16 September 1966 | Austria | Visiting President Franz Jonas |
| 26–28 April 1967 | Italy | Visiting President Giuseppe Saragat |
| 6–12 September 1967 | Brazil | Visiting President Artur da Costa e Silva |
| 13–16 September 1967 | Chile | Visiting President Eduardo Frei Montalva |
| 18–21 September 1967 | Argentina | Visiting President Juan Carlos Onganía |
| 1–3 April 1968 | Switzerland | Visiting President Willy Spühler |
| 24 April – 1 May 1968 | United States | Visiting President Lyndon B. Johnson |
| 5–11 May 1969 | Tunisia | Visiting President Habib Bourguiba |
| 4–8 June 1973 | West Germany | Visiting President Gustav Heinemann |
| 4–6 June 1974 | Iceland | Visiting President Kristján Eldjárn |
| 11–13 September 1974 | Denmark | Visiting Queen Margrethe II and Prince Henrik |
| 4–30 October 1975 | United States | Visiting President Gerald Ford |
| 25–27 November 1975 | Sweden | Visiting King Carl XVI Gustaf and Queen Silvia |
| 21–24 February 1978 | Portugal | Visiting President António dos Santos Ramalho Eanes |
| 7–10 October 1980 | Finland | Visiting President Urho Kekkonen |
| 13–15 September 1982 | Austria | Visiting President Rudolf Kirchschläger |
| 17–24 October 1983 | Japan | Visiting Emperor Hirohito and Empress Nagako |
| 29–31 March 1984 | Spain | Visiting King Juan Carlos and Queen Sofia |
| 23 November 1987 | Canada | Visiting Governor General Jeanne Sauvé |
| 12–15 April 1988 | United Kingdom | Visiting Queen Elizabeth II and Prince Philip |

== State visits received by Olav V ==
| Date(s) | Country | Details |
|---|---|---|
| 11–13 February 1960 | Denmark | visited by King Frederik IX and Queen Ingrid |
| 16–18 March 1960 | Sweden | visited by King Gustaf VI Adolf and Queen Louise |
| 19–21 September 1960 | Thailand | visited by King Bhumibol Adulyadej and Queen Sirikit |
| 8–10 March 1961 | Finland | visited by President Urho Kekkonen and Sylvi Kekkonen |
| 18–20 May 1961 | Iran | visited by Shah Mohammad Reza Pahlavi and Farah Pahlavi |
| 17–19 June 1963 | Tunisia | visited by President Habib Bourguiba and Wassila Bourguiba |
| 6–8 September 1963 | Tanganyika | visited by President Julius Nyerere |
| 10–12 May 1965 | Yugoslavia | visited by President Josip Broz Tito and Jovanka Broz |
| 14–16 June 1965 | Belgium | visited by King Baudouin and Queen Fabiola |
| 22–24 June 1965 | Italy | visited by President Giuseppe Saragat |
| 9–11 September 1970 | West Germany | visited by President Gustav Heinemann and Hilda Heinemann |
| 3–5 May 1971 | Iceland | visited by President Kristján Eldjárn and Halldóra Eldjárn |
| 12–14 February 1973 | Denmark | visited by Queen Margrethe II and Prince Henrik |
| 8–10 October 1974 | Sweden | visited by King Carl XVI Gustaf |
| 28–30 April 1976 | Tanzania | visited by President Julius Nyerere |
| 17–20 April 1978 | Austria | visited by President Rudolf Kirchschläger and Herma Kirchschläger |
| 3–5 June 1980 | Portugal | visited by President António Ramalho Eanes and Manuela Ramalho Eanes |
| 13–15 November 1980 | Romania | visited by President Nicolae Ceaușescu and Elena Ceaușescu |
| 5–8 May 1981 | United Kingdom | visited by Queen Elizabeth II and Prince Philip |
| 26–27 May 1981 | Canada | visited by Governor General Edward Schreyer and Lily Schreyer |
| 21–23 October 1981 | Iceland | visited by President Vigdís Finnbogadóttir |
| 14–16 April 1982 | Spain | visited by King Juan Carlos I and Queen Sofía |
| 8–9 March 1983 | Finland | visited by President Mauno Koivisto and Tellervo Koivisto |
| 14–15 May 1984 | France | visited by President François Mitterrand and Danielle Mitterrand |
| 14–15 February 1985 | Zambia | visited by President Kenneth Kaunda and Betty Kaunda |
| 10–11 June 1985 | Japan | visited by Crown Prince Akihito and Crown Princess Michiko |
| 13–15 May 1986 | The Netherlands | visited by Queen Beatrix and Prince Claus |
| 24–26 September 1986 | West Germany | visited by President Richard von Weizsäcker and Marianne von Weizsäcker |
| 2–4 May 1990 | Luxembourg | visited by Grand Duke Jean and Grand Duchess Joséphine-Charlotte |

== See also ==
- List of state visits made and received by Haakon VII
- List of state visits made and received by Harald V

== Sources ==
- Royal House list of state visits
