= List of state visits made and received by Haakon VII =

Below is a complete list of state visits made and received by Haakon VII of Norway during his reign from 1905 to 1957. Note that the number of state visits is much lower than today as can be seen in the list of state visits made by King Harald V of Norway. Norway was at this time a comparatively poor country and the expenses involved in traveling to other countries in the manner expected by a king, and hosting the customary return visits, were high. In the early years of the independent Norwegian monarchy it was important to affirm the support of the great powers of Europe and state visits were made to the United Kingdom, Germany and France within two years.

== State visits made by Haakon VII ==
Date(s)	Country	Details
3–9 October 1906	Denmark	Visiting King Frederik VIII (his father) and Queen Lovisa
14–16 November 1906	United Kingdom	Visiting King Edward VII (his uncle and father-in-law) and Queen Alexandra
15–16 December 1906	German Empire	Visiting Emperor Wilhelm II (his wife's first cousin) and Empress Augusta Viktoria
27–30 May 1907	France	Visiting President Armand Fallières
11–13 June 1913	Denmark	Visiting King Christian X (his brother) and Queen Alexandrine
15–18 September 1918	Sweden	Visiting King Gustaf V (his mother's first cousin) and Queen Victoria
5–7 June 1923	Netherlands	Visiting Queen Wilhelmina and Prince Hendrik
8–10 June 1923	Belgium	Visiting King Albert I and Queen Elisabeth
2–4 June 1928	Finland	Visiting President Lauri Kristian Relander
17–19 February 1948	Denmark	Visiting King Frederik IX (his nephew) and Queen Ingrid
5–7 June 1951	United Kingdom	Visiting King George VI (his wife's nephew) and Queen Elizabeth
23–25 March 1953	Sweden	Visiting King Gustaf VI Adolf (his second cousin) and Queen Louise
12–14 August 1954	Netherlands	Visiting Queen Juliana and Prince Bernhard

== State visits received by Haakon VII ==
Date(s)	Country	Details
29 April – 2 May 1907	Denmark	visited by King Frederik VIII (his father) and Queen Lovisa
28 April – 2 May 1908	United Kingdom	visited by King Edward VII (his uncle and father-in-law) and Queen Alexandra
31 July – 2 August 1908	France	visited by President Armand Fallières
15–18 September 1922	The Netherlands	visited by Queen Wilhelmina and Prince Hendrik
4–6 October 1926	Finland	visited by President Lauri Kristian Relander
29 September – 1 October 1947	Denmark	visited by King Frederik IX (his nephew) and Queen Ingrid
10–12 March 1952	Sweden	visited by King Gustaf VI Adolf (his second cousin) and Queen Louise
6–8 May 1953	Netherlands	visited by Queen Juliana and Prince Bernhard
18–20 November 1954	Ethiopia	visited by Emperor Haile Selassie and Empress Menen Asfaw
25–28 May 1955	Iceland	visited by President Ásgeir Ásgeirsson and Dóra Þórhallsdóttir
24–26 June 1955	United Kingdom	visited by Queen Elizabeth II (his wife's grandniece) and Prince Philip

== See also ==
- List of state visits made and received by Olav V
- List of state visits made and received by Harald V

== Sources ==
- Royal House list of state visits
