= The Mercy Journals =

2016 book by Claudia Casper

- First edition cover
- Author: Claudia Casper
- Language: English
- Genre: Post-apocalyptic fiction, science fiction
- Publisher: Arsenal Pulp Press
- Publication date: 2016
- Publication place: Canada
- Media type: Print, ebook
- Pages: 234
- ISBN: 9781551526331
- Dewey Decimal: 813.6
- LC Class: PR9199.3.C4315 M47 2016

The Mercy Journals is a 2016 post-apocalyptic science fiction novel by Canadian author Claudia Casper. The novel, set in a near-future world where the global population has been reduced after catastrophic events, was well received by critics and won the 2017 Philip K. Dick Award.

== Background and publication ==
Casper wrote the novel as a way to explore the darker side of human nature, including genocide, and the violence carried out by primates. She drew inspiration from events in human history such as the Rwandan genocide, and from the Gombe Chimpanzee War recorded by primatologist Jane Goodall.

The novel was partly inspired by a newspaper article Casper had read about Roméo Dallaire, the former commander of the United Nations Assistance Mission for Rwanda, being found intoxicated and suicidal on a park bench in Hull, Quebec. She became fascinated by the impact that witnessing genocide could have on a person, and flew to Ottawa to attend talks by Dallaire, who had become an advocate for people living with PTSD. Casper originally planned to write a biography about him, but changed her mind after learning that he was already working on an autobiography titled Shake Hands with the Devil. Instead, Casper began writing a novel about a war veteran who struggles with PTSD related to a genocide. The protagonist of the novel, a veteran named Mercy, has some traits inspired by Dallaire.

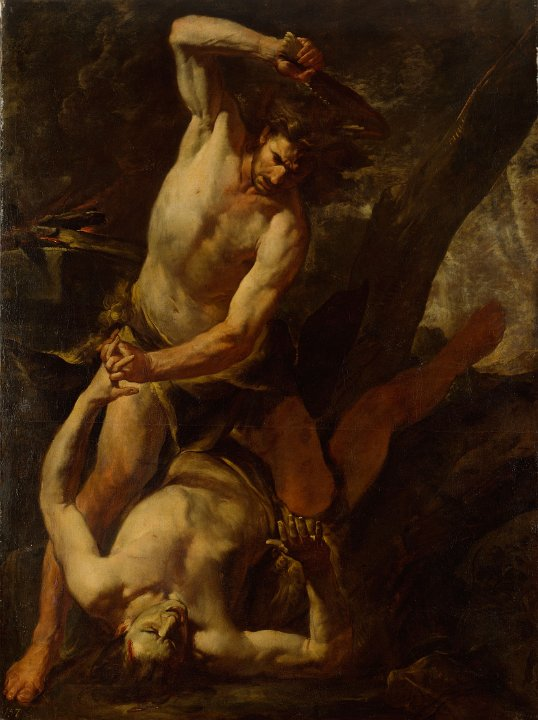
Painting of Cain and Abel by Italian Renaissance artist Gioacchino Assereto

Several reviewers found similarities between the relationship of Mercy and his brother Leo, and the Biblical story of Cain and Abel. Casper herself acknowledged these parallels, describing it as "in part, a reworking of Cain and Abel—a last murder as opposed to a first murder." Early in development, the novel was titled The Last Murder as a reference to this. Casper intended for Mercy to represent Abel while Leo was a "Cain figure". While writing, she consulted the Jewish Publication Society of America Version of the text and studied the accompanying Midrash. She incorporated references to passages from Genesis into the book.

The novel was published as The Mercy Journals by Arsenal Pulp Press in May 2016. The book was printed on paper with roughened edges to "convey a weathered, beaten look."

== Synopsis ==
The novel takes place in 2047, after warfare, climate change, water shortages and pandemics have reduced the global population. These disasters caused a collapse of national governments, and humanity now lives under OneWorld, a global government that imposes strict rationing of all resources. Couples are not allowed to have more than one child, and even pets are forbidden because they consume resources. The story is told through the journal entries of Allen "Mercy" Quincy, a veteran of World War III with severe PTSD. The first part of the novel takes place in former Seattle where Mercy earns a meager living as a parking enforcement officer and secretly keeps pet goldfish.

Mercy begins to fall in love with a dancer named Ruby, who brings him out of his shell. He eventually confides in Ruby and tells her about his memories of a genocide against migrants on the Mexico–United States border during World War III. Their relationship dissolves after Mercy's estranged brother Leo returns and reveals that Mercy's abandoned sons are still alive. Leo says that the children may be at their family's cabin on Vancouver Island. The second part of the novel takes place when Mercy and his brother go out into the wilderness in search of them. During their time on the island, Mercy is repeatedly attacked by a mountain lion and tensions develop between the brothers.

== Themes ==
The novel deals with themes of loss, societal change and human responses to extremity and resource scarcity. The characters within the novel react to the societal changes caused by major upheavals in different ways, reflecting their class affiliation and age. Climate change and environmentalism is another major theme of the novel, which takes place after Earth's environment has been damaged.

Some reviewers observed that the narrative explores dichotomies, such as the ones between hope and pessimism, mental illness and sanity, and capitalist and communist ideologies. Kyle Schoenfeld of Prism International wrote that "The Mercy Journals threads its way between optimism and pessimism, utopia and dystopia." Leo and Mercy are portrayed as opposites; Mercy is a fundamentally decent man who is at odds with his more self-interested brother.

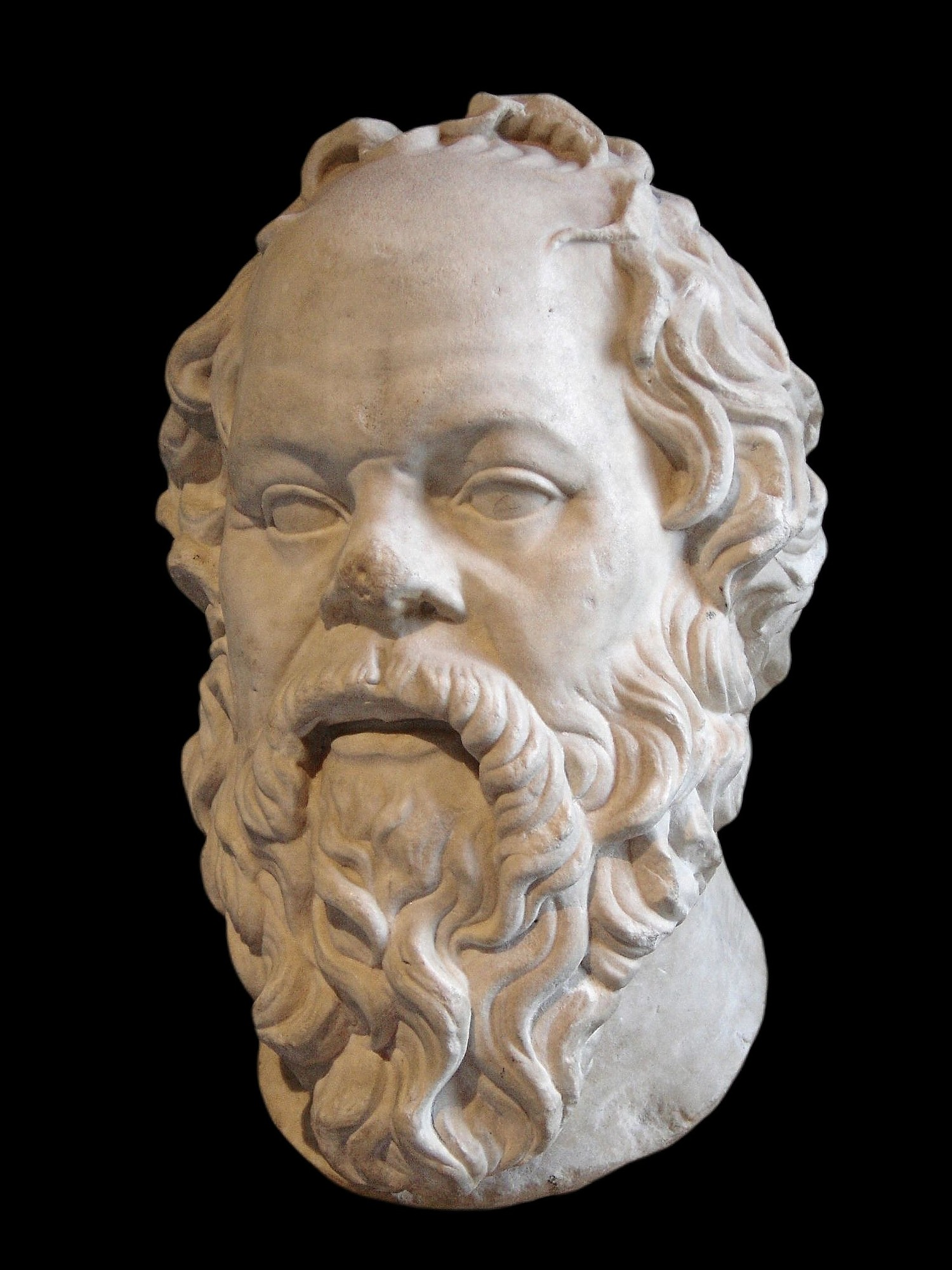
Marble bust of Socrates

In Quill & Quire, reviewer Robert J. Wiersema noted that the novel's format as a fictional diary allowed for "emotional immediacy and directness", and "suits the material, which circles around questions of truth and memory, trust and betrayal." Within the novel's narrative, Mercy engages in journaling as a way to relieve his guilt and allow him to process the trauma of his experiences. The character is inspired by the Greek philosopher Socrates' assertion that writing diminishes the mind's memory. Casper decided to use the narrative device of journals after seeing a quote from Socrates' student Plato that read "writing destroys memory".

Emma Morgan-Thorp, in a review for Canadian Literature, described its narrative as "a musing on a post-apocalyptic future, one man’s story of grappling with post-traumatic stress disorder (PTSD), an archetypal journey into the Canadian wilderness, a family drama, a love story."

== Reception ==
The book received mostly positive reviews by critics. Candace Fertile of the Vancouver Sun felt that the book "work[s] on two levels: as a cautionary tale and as an examination of one man’s struggle to find meaning in life." Publishers Weekly wrote that "Casper employs clear, concise prose that at a steady clip, and the exploration, through one man's account, of what it means to outlive one's purpose is tightly constructed if not especially groundbreaking." Kelly McCarty of Speculative Chic gave the book a more negative review, writing that it was "a book that doesn’t know what story it wants to tell."

The novel won the 2017 Philip K. Dick Award. This made Casper the first Canadian woman to win the literary award.
