= Sam Kassin =

American educator

Sam Kassin (lit. Shlomo Kassin, Hebrew: סם קסין; born 1944), also known as "Rabbi Sammy", is a Rosh Yeshiva in Israel. He is also the Chief Rabbi of the Bukharan Quarter of Jerusalem.

== Biography ==
The son of Esther Sutton and Ezra Kassin, Kassin descends from a line of rabbis that dates back to 1600, with roots in Spain. One of 10 children, he was born in 1944 in New York City but raised in Miami Beach, Florida. Kassin did not study Torah until he was 16. He started study in the Ner Yisroel Yeshiva in Baltimore, Maryland. After four years in Baltimore, he spent four more years studying at the Porat Yosef Yeshiva in Jerusalem. It was there that he developed a close relationship with the Gadol Hador, the Gaon, Rabbi Ovadia Yoseph, then Sephardic Chief Rabbi of Israel, who ordained him as a rabbi in 1971.

In 1972, Kassin returned to the United States at the request of Rabbi Moshe Shamah to establish a high school for the children of the Syrian Jewish community in Brooklyn. Kassin stayed on as principal of the Sephardic High School for five years. Following his tenure there, he returned to Israel and from 1977 to 1980 directed the one-year program for American youth at Aish Hatorah yeshiva in Jerusalem.

In 1980, Dr. Joe Nissim, president and founder of the Sephardic Educational Center, recruited Kassin to be its first director. A year later, together with Rabbi Eliyahu Shamoula, Kassin opened the SSC yeshiva in the Old City.
