= Mary Schendlinger =

Mary Schendlinger (born August 1948) is a writer and editor. She is the senior editor at Geist, a magazine she co-founded with Stephen Osborne.

== Personal life ==
Schendlinger grew up in Waukesha, Wisconsin. As a child, she was greatly inspired by Mad Magazine, and submitted her writing and comics to it several times without success.

She currently lives in Vancouver, British Columbia.

== Professional career. ==
Schendlinger worked for seven years as an editorial/production assistant at Talon books, then for ten years as a managing editor for Harbour Publishing, where she was responsible for the Encyclopedia of British Columbia. She was also employed as a typesetter by Pulp Press (now Arsenal Pulp Press) involved with Press Gang Publishers's Makara magazine.

Schendlinger has edited books for Douglas & McIntyre, Greystone Books, Raincoast Books, Heritage House, Calypso Books, Arsenal Pulp Press, as well as publications for the Vancouver Art Gallery.

Schendlinger has taught at Simon Fraser University, the University of British Columbia, and Malaspina College.

== Books ==
- Prepare To Be Amazed: The Geniuses of Modern Magic Toronto: Annick Press, 2005.
- The Totem Poles of Stanley Park (with Vickie Jensen). Vancouver: Westcoast Words in association with Subway Books, 2004.
- The Little Greenish-Brown Book of Slugs (as Eve Corbel). Vancouver: Arsenal Pulp Press, 1993.
- The Little Blonde Book of Kim Campbell. Vancouver: Arsenal Pulp Press, 1993.
- Power Parenting Your Teenager (as Mary Eve Corbel). Bridgeport, Conn: Hysteria Publications, 1997.
