= Joseph Pearson (writer) =

Canadian writer

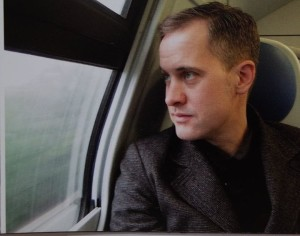

Joseph Sanders Pearson an essayist and writer.

== Life ==
Between 1997 and 2001, Pearson received his doctorate in Modern History at the University of Cambridge. Pearson has taught in the humanities at Columbia University, New York University, the Berlin University of the Arts, and the Barenboim–Said Akademie, a peace project headed by conductor Daniel Barenboim. He is the nephew of children's novelist Kit Pearson.

== Career ==
His history and portrait of the German capital, Berlin, was published by Reaktion Press and University of Chicago Press in 2017. The Independent called Berlin "the last word in explaining not only Berlin’s incredible history, but also its present day cultural situation" and Bloomberg reported that the book "masterfully offers a close reading of the metropolis in all its brutal immediacy". The book was also positively reviewed in The German Studies Review.

Pearson's second book My Grandfather's Knife was published by HarperCollins and The History Press in April 2022, with a Spanish translation by Planeta in October 2022. The book tells the stories of Second World War witnesses through everyday objects they owned. The book received positive reviews in The Spectator, the Literary Review of Canada and elsewhere, with Norman Ohler, author of Blitzed, calling the book, "literary non-fiction at its best". A chapter from the book, regarding Nazi plunder of string instruments obtained by the Reich Ministry of Public Enlightenment and Propaganda, appeared in German in the literary review Lettre International.

His third book (2025), The Airlift, is an everyday history of the Berlin Airlift, published with The History Press in the UK, and Pegasus Books in North America (under the separate title, Sweet Victory). Lettre International published a chapter in German in their Summer 2025 edition. Kirkus Reviews called it 'the dawn of the Cold War through a gimlet eye' and Publishers' Weekly 'an illuminating, up-close look at the Berlin Airlift...[that] adds complexity to a major historical turning point'. In a Times Literary Supplement review of The Airlift and Ian Buruma's Stay Alive, Rebecca K. Morrison praised The Airlift for its "meticulous research" and "undeniable relevance", calling it "an excellent contribution to the Berlin bookshelf in time of war" and describing Pearson as "a lively writer, alert to detail".

His fourth book is a portrait of the German theatremaker, Thomas Ostermeier. Wer Da? Begegnungen mit Thomas Ostermeier was published in German in 2026 by the Alexander Verlag and is based on essays Pearson wrote as in-house essayist of the Schaubühne Theatre.

Pearson's work has otherwise appeared in The Guardian, New England Review, AGNI, Monocle Magazine, Prism International, Geist, Newsweek, the BBC, and other publications. His non-fiction has been translated into German, French, Arabic, Mandarin and other languages.

Pearson is based in Berlin, Germany, where he is the in-house essayist of the Schaubühne Theatre and the editor of The Needle, one of Berlin's most popular blogs. He is a founding member of the artist collective, 'AGOSTO'.

== Publications ==
- Berlin. Reaktion Books, London 2017, ISBN 978-1-78023-719-0
- My Grandfather's Knife. The History Press, Stroud 2022 / HarperCollins, Toronto 2022, ISBN 978-0-7509-9739-3, 978-1-4434-6592-2
- Sweet Victory: How the Berlin Airlift Divided East and West / The Airlift. The History Press, Stroud 2025 / Pegasus Books, New York 2025, ISBN 978-1-80399-822-0, 978-1-63936-858-7
- Wer Da? Begegnungen mit Thomas Ostermeier. Alexander Verlag, Berlin 2026. ISBN 978-3-89581-656-7

== Awards ==
In 2020, he was awarded a Jacob Zilber Prize for Short Fiction (First Runner-up), for his story "An Iconostasis". The story was nominated in 2020 for the Pushcart Prize.
