= Stephen Osborne (writer) =

Canadian writer and editor (born 1947)

- Born: September 11, 1947 (age 78); Pangnirtung, Northwest Territories, (now Nunavut) Canada
- Occupations: writer, editor
- Writing career
- Language: English
- Notable awards: CBC Literary Award 2003 Travel Writing; Vancouver Arts Award 2004 Writing and Publishing

Stephen Osborne (born September 11, 1947) is a Canadian writer and editor. He is the author of Ice & Fire: Dispatches from the New World, and since 1990 has been an editor of Geist magazine.

== Life and work ==
The son of a doctor, Osborne was born in 1947 in Pangnirtung on Baffin Island, Northwest Territories (now Nunavut), and grew up in Edmonton, Kamloops and Vancouver.

In 1971, he co-founded Arsenal Pulp Press, a literary book publisher based in Vancouver. He founded the Vancouver Desktop Publishing Company in 1986, and was chairman of the Publishers Automation Committee for two years in the 1980s, during which time he helped fifty small publishing companies to computerise. He has also been President of both the Association of Book Publishers of British Columbia and the British Columbia Association of Magazine Publishers.

Osborne co-founded Geist in 1990 with Mary Schendlinger. As well as editing the magazine, he writes an essay for each issue and also publishes photographs under the alias Mandelbrot.

Osborne published a collection of personal essays, Ice & fire: Dispatches from the New World, 1988-1998 in 1999. He was the winner of the inaugural Vancouver Arts Award for Writing and Publishing in 2004. He won the CBC Literary Award for Travel Writing in 2003 for his essay Girl Afraid of Haystacks. He's also won the National Magazine Foundation Special Achievement Award.

He has written introductions to the books The North End (photographs by John Paskievich) and One Ring Circus: Extreme Wrestling in the Minor Leagues.

Osborne currently lives in Vancouver, British Columbia.

== Bibliography ==
- Ice & fire : dispatches from the new world, 1988-1998, (Selected personal essays) 1999 (Arsenal Pulp Press)
- Social Credit for Beginners: An Armchair Guide (Co-author) (A Satirical History of Social Credit) 1987 (Pulp Press)
- Little Red Books (17 volumes) beginning with Quotations from Chairman Zalm in 1989
- "Introduction", in "The North End: Photographs by John Paskievich", 2008 (University of Manitoba Press)
- The Coincidence Problem: Selected Dispatches 1999-2022, 2024 (Arsenal Pulp Press)
