= Shlomo Moussaieff (rabbi) =

Bukharan rabbi

- שלמה מוסאיוף
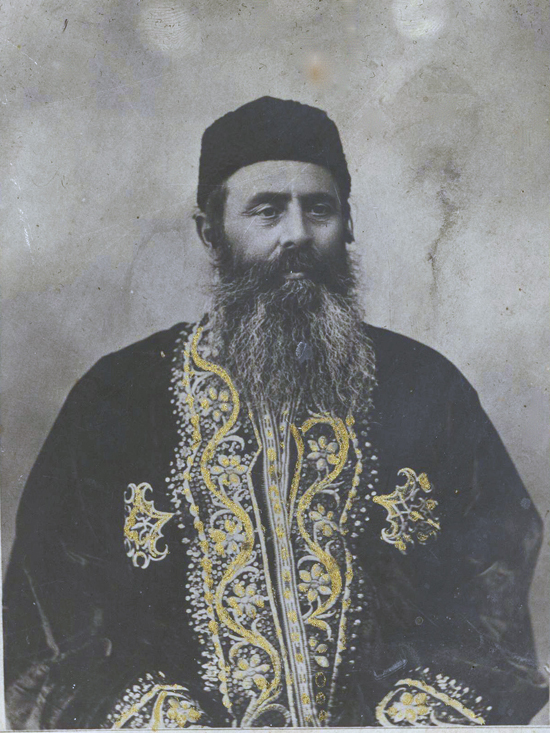
- Born: Shlomo Moussaieff; 1852; Bukhara, Emirate of Bukhara
- Died: 1922 (aged 69–70); Jerusalem
- Occupation: Merchant
- Known for: One of the founders of the Bukharim neighborhood of Jerusalem

Shlomo Moussaieff (Hebrew: שלמה מוסאיוף; 1852 – 1922) was a rabbi and gemstone trader, from Bukhara, in what is today Uzbekistan. He was one of the founders of the Bukharim neighborhood in Jerusalem.

== Early life ==
Moussaieff was born in the city of Bukhara in 1852, to a family of wealthy Bukharan traders, who had been trading in Jerusalem for five generations. Bukhara is part of the old Silk Road in Central Asia, located in what is now Uzbekistan, and Moussaieff's ancestors had grown rich on precious stones in the caravan trade.

As a child, he learned under Rabbi David Chafin and Joshua Shushan. Joining him in his studies were Yosef Kohjinoff, Rafael Potihaloff, Moshe Cheh Yizhakoff, Avraham Aminoff Talmudi, and Aba Shimon Gaon. He had an honorary title of rabbi. As a merchant he engaged in the tea trade and real estate, and is said to have started one of the first banks in Bukhara. In 1888, motivated by religious convictions, he made aliyah to Israel and was one of several Bukharan Jews responsible for founding the new Jerusalem neighborhood of Rehovot HaBukharim (later shortened to Bukharim) in 1891. He built a complex of apartments for use by 25 poor families, which included four synagogues. Today the Moussaieff complex of synagogues, which now numbers eight synagogues, is in continuous use.

In the prayer book which he authored, Hukat Olam, Moussaieff described his motivation in moving to Jerusalem and his religious conviction:

"I, Shlomo Moussaieff, native of Bukhara.. My spirit moved me to leave the land of my birth, in which I grew up, and to ascend to the Holy Land, the land in which our ancestors dwelled in happiness, the land whose memory passes before us ten times each day in our prayers...We do not have any festive occasion without a memorial to Jerusalem....There is no doubt that I am required to thank God for all the good he has done for me. He has brought me across the sea three times. He has kept me alive, and has brought me to the place of my desire for the good life and peace to see the pleasantness of God and to visit his sanctuary. If the temple was standing, I would bring a sacrifice of thanksgiving. Now because of our sins there is no temple and no priest to bring the sacrifice. Therefore I had the idea to help the many and publish these prayer books for the weekdays and Sabbath and holidays. Prayer is a substitute for sacrifice. Prayer to God is what connects Israel to their Father in Heaven, although the Israelite nation has been vanquished in exile for more than eighteen hundred years".

From the late 19th century until World War I, the Bukharim neighborhood was one of the most affluent sections of the city, populated by Bukharan Jewish merchants and religious scholars supported primarily by various trading activities such as cotton, gemstones, and tea in Central Asia and Russia. After World War I and the 1917 Bolshevik Revolution, however, the neighborhood fell into decline as overseas sources of income were cut off and residents were left with just their homes in Jerusalem, forcing them to subdivide and rent out rooms to bring in income. The Revolution also brought a flood of impoverished Russian Jewish refugees to the neighborhood. Later Jews from Persia and Iran joined the mix, and overcrowding became rife. From being lauded as one of the most beautiful neighborhoods of Jerusalem, Bukharim earned the opposite sobriquet, of being the poorest neighborhood of Jerusalem. Today Bukharim's original glory can still be seen in a few restored houses, but many buildings are dilapidated or in ruins. Many houses have been demolished in favor of new construction. The population profile has also changed: today most residents are Haredi.

== Other interests ==
As a religious scholar, Moussaieff was also a collector of rare religious texts and manuscripts of Maimonides and Rabbi Haim Vital. This collection is currently housed in a special collection in the Bar-Ilan University library.

== Personal ==
The family name, Moussaieff, was taken from Shlomo Moussaieff's ancestor, Moshe or Musa, the son of Yakov, who was born in 1771 and died in 1843. Moshe was the grandfather of Shlomo Moussaieff. Moussaieff's father was named Yakov who was born in 1812 and died in Jerusalem in 1892. Yakov Moussaieff's wife, Sarah, died in Bukhara in 1889.

Shlomo Moussaieff married Esther Gaonoff, who traced her ancestry to Yosef Maimon, originally of Tetuan, Morocco, who arrived in Bukhara in the late 18th century and revived Rabbinic learning there. Maman married Hannah, the daughter of Mullah Jan Tajah of Sharisabz. Their daughter, Miriam, married Mullah Pinhas Hakatan (d. 1875), a renowned Rabbi, called by the missionary and traveler, Joseph Wolff, "the most learned of the Jews of Bukhara" and "a young man of extraordinary talents". Malka, the daughter of Pinhas Hakatan, married Avraham Haim Gaon. According to legend, Avraham Haim Gaon traveled from Bukhara to Jerusalem on a lion's back as recounted by his grandson, Raphael Gaon:

Avraham Haim Gaon decided to travel to Jerusalem. He prepared himself and others for the long trip and they set off traveling via Afghanistan. In Afghanistan, they hired a guide who instructed them to travel by way of the Indian desert and from there to Jerusalem. The group traveled for a week. When the Sabbath was about to begin, Avraham Haim Gaon suggested to the group that they stop traveling until after the Sabbath. The members of the group, however, consulted with the guide who told them that the area they were in was inhabited by dangerous animals and they must leave immediately for safer ground. Avraham Haim Gaon decided to stay while the others, due to fear, left. He made the kiddush, ate as was customary, slept well, and rose and prayed. When the Sabbath was over, he noticed a lion approaching and very much afraid, he took hold of his equipment. But then the lion crawled between his legs and carried him." Avraham Haim Gaon was the father of Esther Gaonoff and of the renowned Rabbi Aba Shimon Gaon. He died in 1910 in Jerusalem.

Moussaieff and his wife had seven children: Yehuda, Sam, Henri, Maurice, Rehavia (who was named after the neighborhood Moussaieff helped found, Rehovot HaBukharim, Sarah, and Bat Sheva.

Moussaieff's sons mostly moved abroad, to France, England and then to the United States. They primarily engaged in trade in pearls and precious stones. His son Sam (Shlomo), a millionaire and Judaica mogul, was offered by Haim Schneebalg about 90 pages of the Aleppo Codex, but Moussaieff was greedy and tried to have a better price.

== Death ==
Moussaieff was devoutly religious and committed to living in the Land of Israel. On his deathbed, he stipulated in his oral will that only those of his sons who lived in the Land of Israel would receive his inheritance. Much of his property in the Bukharim quarter was declared a "religious endowment" (hekdesh in Hebrew and waqf in Arabic), which could not be sold for perpetuity. Till this day, proceeds from rentals of his property are received by the direct male descendants of Moussaieff who live in Israel.

Moussaieff died at the age of 70 in 1922. He and several of his sons are buried on the Mount of Olives in Jerusalem.

== See also ==
- Dorrit Moussaieff
- Shlomo Moussaieff (businessman)
- Jeffrey Moussaieff Masson
