= Georgia Björnsson =

First Lady of Iceland

First Lady of Iceland
- In role 17 June 1944 – 25 January 1952
- President: Sveinn Björnsson
- Preceded by: Position Established
- Succeeded by: Dóra Þórhallsdóttir

Personal details
- Born: 18 January 1884; Denmark
- Died: 18 September 1957 (aged 73)

Georgia Björnsson (born Georgia Hansen; 18 January 1884 – 18 September 1957) was the wife of the first Icelandic President Sveinn Björnsson and was the First Lady of Iceland from 1944 to 1952. Björnsson was born in Denmark to Danish parents.

== Honours ==
- Iceland: Dame Grand Cross of the Order of the Falcon (1 January 1946)

== Family ==
On 2 September 1908 she married Sveinn Björnsson (born 27 February 1881, died 25 January 1952). They had six children: Björn (1909), Anna Catherine Aagot (1911), Henrik (1914), Sveinn Christen (1916), Ólafur (1919), Elísabet (1922). Her eldest son Björn Sveinsson Björnsson served in the German military as a part of the Schutzstaffel in World War II.

Her great grand daughter is Georgía Olga Kristiansen, the first female referee to officiate in the highest competitive tier men's basketball league in Iceland. Her great grandson is Henrik Björnsson, singer and lead guitarist in the shoegaze rock band Singapore Sling.

Honorary titles
Preceded by New title	First Lady of Iceland; 1944 – 1952	Succeeded by Dóra Þórhallsdóttir
