= Dóra Þórhallsdóttir =

First Lady of Iceland from 1952 to 1964

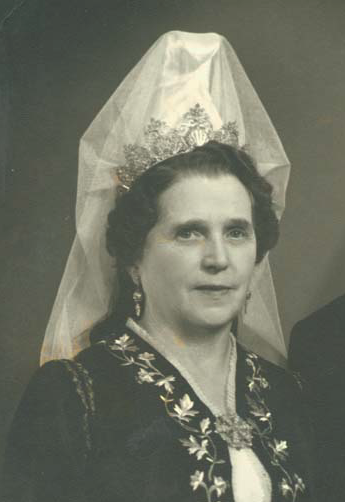

First Lady of Iceland
- In role 1 August 1952 – 10 September 1964
- President: Ásgeir Ásgeirsson
- Preceded by: Georgia Björnsson
- Succeeded by: Halldóra Eldjárn

Personal details
- Born: 23 February 1893
- Died: 10 September 1964 (aged 71)

Dóra Þórhallsdóttir (23 February 1893 – 10 September 1964) was the wife of the Icelandic President Ásgeir Ásgeirsson starting in 1917 and First Lady of Iceland from 1952 to 1964. She was the daughter of Þórhallur Bjarnarson (1855–1916), 6th Bishop of Iceland (1908–1916). Her brother was Tryggvi Þórhallsson, who was the 5th Prime Minister of Iceland (1927–1932).

== Honours ==
- Iceland: Dame Grand Cross of the Order of the Falcon (1 December 1953)

Honorary titles
Preceded by Georgia Björnsson	First Lady of Iceland; 1952–1964	Succeeded by Halldóra Eldjárn
