= Bukharan Quarter =

Neighborhood in Jerusalem, Israel

Coordinates: 31°47′35″N 35°13′8″E

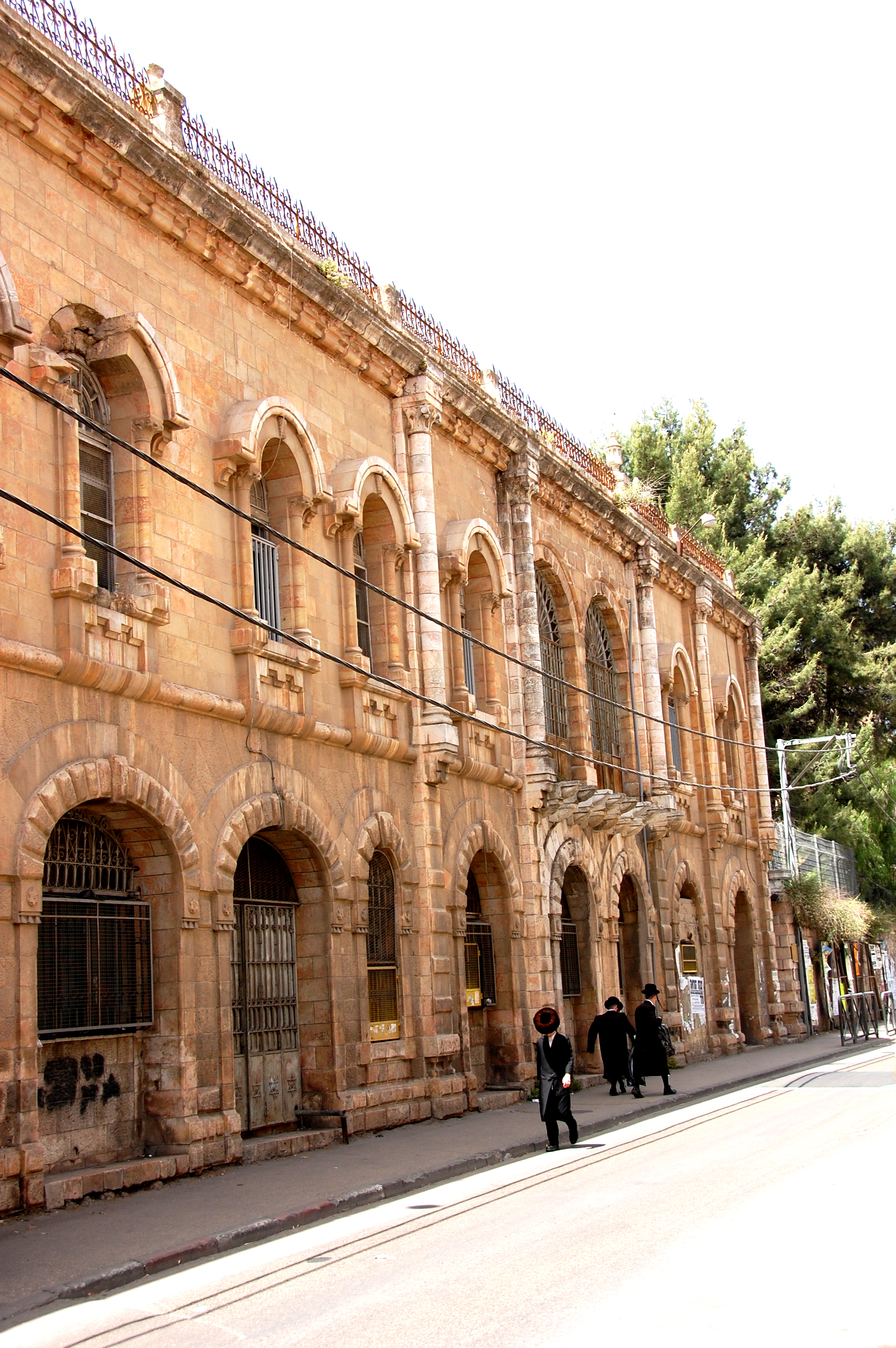
Yehudayoff Palace ("Armon") in the Bukharan quarter

The Bukharan Quarter (Hebrew: שכונת הבוכרים, Shkhunat HaBukharim), also HaBukharim Quarter or Bukharim Quarter, (Note: The mixed Hebrew-English transliterated name "the Bukharim Quarter" is sometimes used by both official and non-official institutions and media – see for instance the Jerusalem Municipality website here, the Israel Postal Company's stamp souvenir sheet here, and The New York Times here.) is a neighborhood in the center of Jerusalem, Israel. The neighborhood was established by Bukharan Jews of the Old Yishuv. The neighborhood also anchored communities from modern-day Afghanistan and Iran. It belonged to the early Jewish neighborhoods built outside the Old City of Jerusalem as part of a process which began in the 1850s. Today most of the residents are Haredi Jews.

The quarter borders Tel Arza on the west, the Shmuel HaNavi neighborhood on the north, Arzei HaBira on the east, and Geula on the south.

The current Chief Rabbi of the Bukharan Quarter is Rabbi Shlomo Kassin.

== History ==
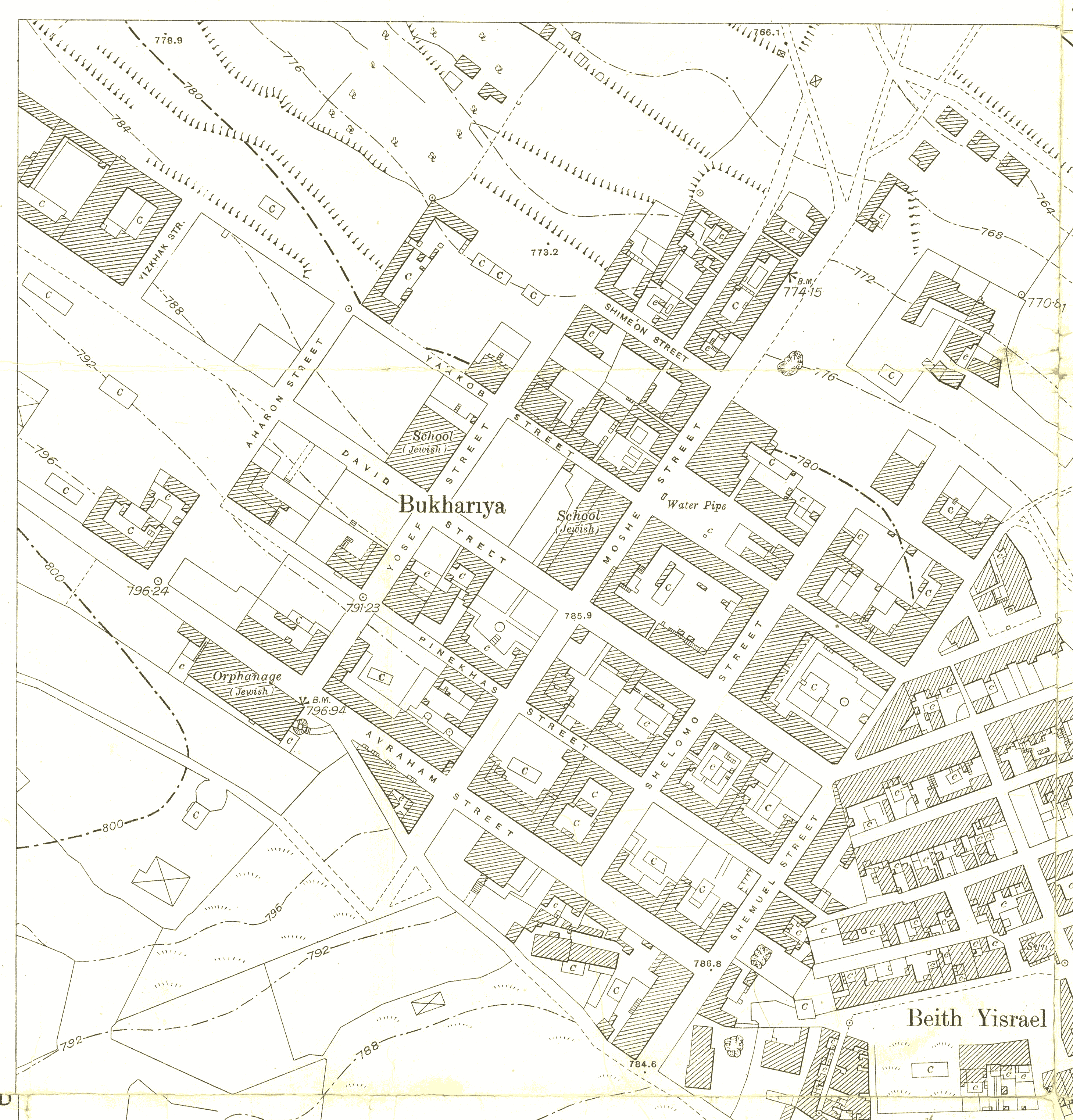
Bukharan Quarter of Jerusalem in 1925

The first immigrants of Bukharan Jews from Russian Turkestan (Central Asia) settled in Jerusalem in the 1870s and 1880s. In 1890, seven members of the Bukharan Jewish community formed the Hovevei Zion Association of the Jewish communities of Bukhara, Samarkand and Tashkent. In 1891, the association bought land and drew up a charter stating that the new quarter would be built in the style of Europe's major cities. Architect Conrad Schick was employed to design the neighborhood. The streets were three times wider than even major thoroughfares in Jerusalem at the time, and spacious mansions were built with large courtyards. The homes were designed with neo-Gothic windows, European tiled roofs, neo-Moorish arches and Italian marble. Facades were decorated with Jewish motifs such as the Star of David and Hebrew inscriptions.

The founders named their settlement Rehovot based on a verse from the Hebrew Bible: "so (Isaac) called it Rehoboth [that is Broad places or Room], saying, "Now the Lord has made room for us, and we shall be fruitful in the land." (Genesis 26:22). It became also historically known as Bukhariyeh.

The neighborhood's Baba Tama Synagogue was built in 1894 and named for the Bukharan Jew who financed it.

In 1905-1908, a dairy was opened and cotton fields were planted on the outskirts of the neighborhood. Construction of the quarter continued into the early 1950s. A total of 200 houses were built. During World War I, the Ottoman army occupied several buildings and cut down almost all of the trees. In 1920, a factory for weaving Persian carpets opened, providing employment for 80 women.

Between 1953-1963, Rabbi Bernard M. Casper was working as Dean for Student Affairs at the Hebrew University of Jerusalem, and during this period he became deeply concerned about the impoverished Quarter. After his appointment as Chief Rabbi in South Africa he set up a special fund for the Quarter's improvement and this was tied with Prime Minister Menachem Begin's urban revitalization program, Project Renewal. Johannesburg was twinned with the Bukharan Quarter, and Johannesburg Jewry raised enormous funds for its rehabilitation. Frustrated by the lack of progress, Casper traveled to Jerusalem in 1981 to resolve the hurdles. He consulted with community organizer Moshe Kahan and suggested that they present the dormant agencies with concrete evidence of what could be done. Using a private discretionary fund, he initiated development of several pilot projects, among them a free loan fund, a dental clinic and a hearing center whose successes spurred the municipality back on track.

== Landmarks ==
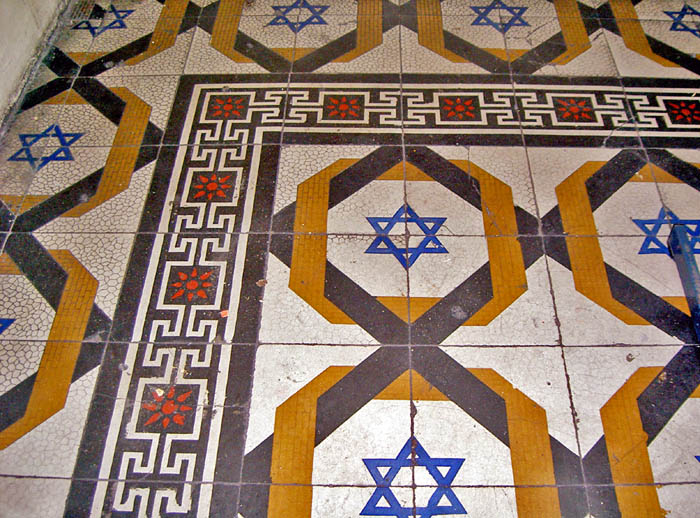
Decorative tiled floor of the Armon

Between 1905–1914 Bukharan merchant Elisha Yehudayoff and his son-in-law, Yisrael Haim Hefetz, built the Armon (lit. "palace") using local limestone and Italian marble with Italian-baroque ornaments. The "Armon" hosted many of the leading figures of the time. During World War I, the Ottoman army had its headquarters there. When the British captured Jerusalem in 1917, a celebratory reception was held in the "Armon". 200 Jewish soldiers serving in the British army attended a Passover Seder there. In 1921, the founding convention of the Chief Rabbinate took place at the "Armon", at which Rabbis Abraham Isaac Kook and Jacob Meir were elected. At the end of the British Mandate the "Armon" served as a meeting place for the Irgun.

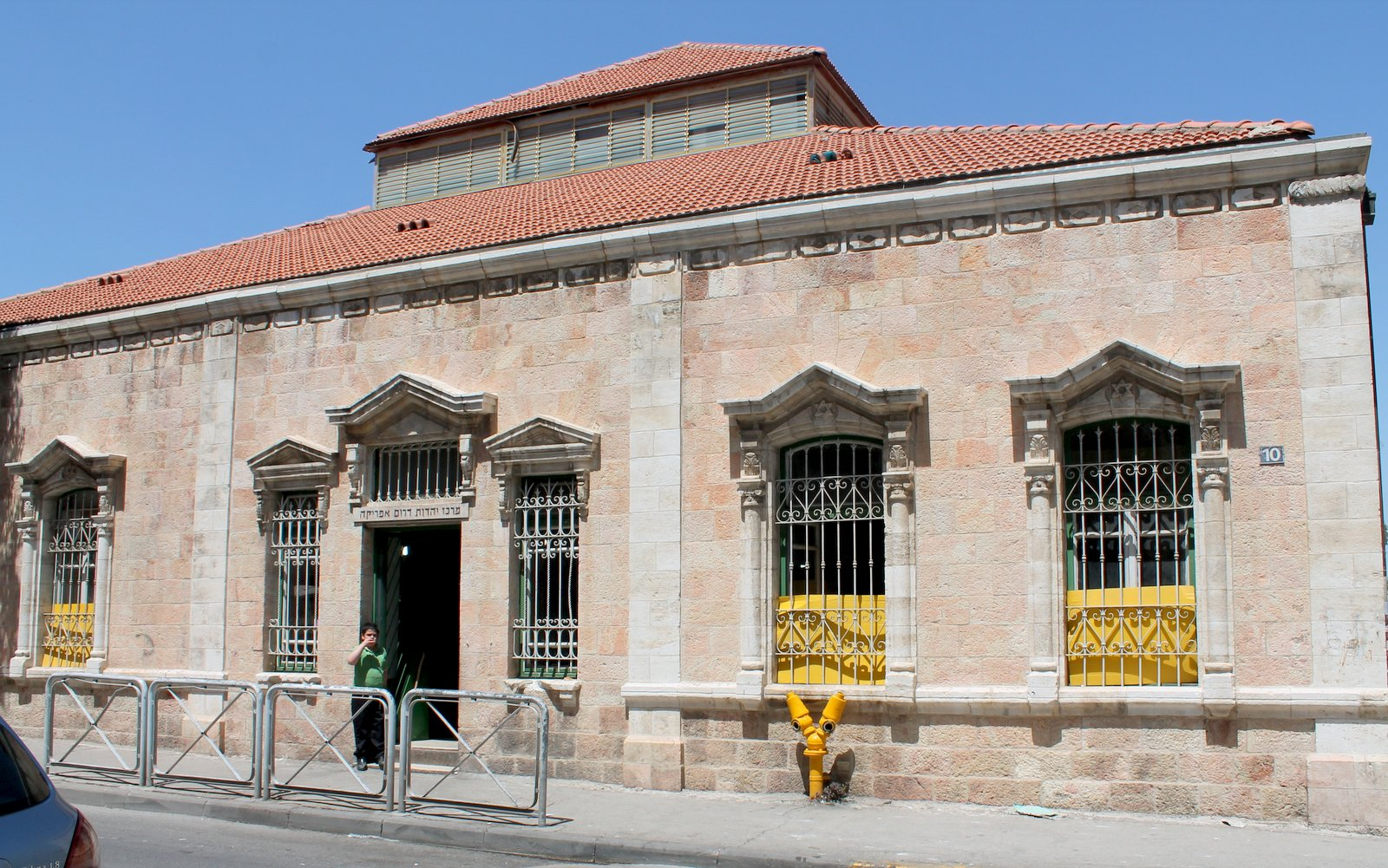
Davidoff House

The Davidoff House (10, HaBukharim Street) was built in 1906 as an opulent Italian-style mansion for Joseph Davidoff, after the Great War it became for a decade (1915–25) the home of the Hebrew Gymnasium in Jerusalem, a high school which had been founded in the neighborhood in 1909, and it currently serves as the quarter's community center.

== Notable residents ==
- Yitzhak Ben-Zvi (1884–1963), historian, Labor Zionist leader, President of Israel
- Joseph Klausner (1874–1958), historian and professor of Hebrew literature
- Dorrit Moussaieff (born 1950), Israeli jewellery designer, former First Lady of Iceland
- Shlomo Moussaieff (1852–1922), rabbi, gemstone trader, one of the neighborhood's founders
- Moshe Sharett (1894–1965), Labor Zionist leader, Prime Minister of Israel
- Rachel Yanait (1886–1979), educator, leading Labor Zionist, wife of Yitzhak Ben-Zvi
- Yitzhak Kaduri (c. 1898–2006), Israeli Kabbalist.
- Avraham Chaim Naeh (1890–1954), Posek.
- Yaakov Chaim Sofer (1870-1939), Sephardic rabbi.
- Reuven Elbaz (1944–), Sephardic rabbi.
- Yitzhak Goldknopf (1950–), Israeli politician.

== See also ==
- Batei Saidoff, a house built in 1911 by Y. Saidoff, a Bukharan Jew, outside the Bukharan Quarter
- Bukharan Jews in Israel
- Expansion of Jerusalem in the 19th century
- History of Jerusalem
