= Halldóra Eldjárn =

First Lady of Iceland from 1968 to 1980

First Lady of Iceland
- In role 1 August 1968 – 1 August 1980
- President: Kristján Eldjárn
- Preceded by: Dóra Þórhallsdóttir
- Succeeded by: Guðrún Katrín Þorbergsdóttir

Personal details
- Born: 24 November 1923 Ísafjörður, Kingdom of Iceland
- Died: 21 December 2008 (aged 85) Reykjavík, Iceland

Halldóra Eldjárn (24 November 1923 – 21 December 2008) was the wife of Icelandic President Kristján Eldjárn and First Lady of Iceland from 1968 to 1980.

Halldóra Ingólfsdóttir was born and raised in Ísafjörður. Her parents were Ingólfur Árnason, a businessman, and his wife Ólöf Sigríður Jónasdóttir; she was the eldest of four children. She graduated from the Commercial College of Iceland in 1942 and worked in an office in Reykjavík until her marriage to archaeologist and museum director Kristján Eldjárn in 1947. They lived in Reykjavík and had four children. He retired in 1980 after three terms as President; after his death in 1982, Halldóra worked for the University of Iceland dictionary for a number of years.

Honorary titles
| Preceded by Dóra Þórhallsdóttir | First Lady of Iceland; 1968–1980 | Vacant Title next held by Guðrún Katrín Þorbergsdóttir |
