= Eliza Reid =

First Lady of Iceland from 2016 to 2024

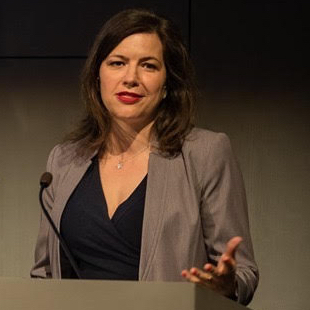
- Reid in 2019

First Lady of Iceland
- In role 1 August 2016 – 1 August 2024
- President: Guðni Th. Jóhannesson
- Preceded by: Dorrit Moussaieff
- Succeeded by: Björn Skúlason

Personal details
- Born: Eliza Jean Reid; 5 May 1976 (age 50) Ottawa, Ontario, Canada
- Spouse: Guðni Th. Jóhannesson (m. 2004)
- Children: 4
- Education: Trinity College, Toronto; St Antony's College, Oxford

Eliza Jean Reid (born 5 May 1976) is a Canadian-Icelandic writer who, from 2016 to 2024, was the First Lady of Iceland through her marriage to Icelandic President Guðni Th. Jóhannesson. Prior to becoming First Lady she co-founded the Iceland Writers Retreat, was a freelance writer for multiple Icelandic magazines and editor of the Icelandair Stopover from 2012 to 2016.

== Early life and education ==
Reid was born on 5 May 1976 in Ottawa, Ontario, Canada. She moved with her family to Ashton, Ontario, as a child. After moving, she attended Bell High School in Nepean, Ontario. As a student at Trinity College, University of Toronto, Reid became a choral scholar and served as Head of College. After she moved to Iceland she sang for the Hallgrímskirkja Motet Choir. After she graduated from the University of Toronto with a bachelor's degree in international relations, she went to St Antony's College, Oxford University, to complete an MA degree in modern history.

== Career ==
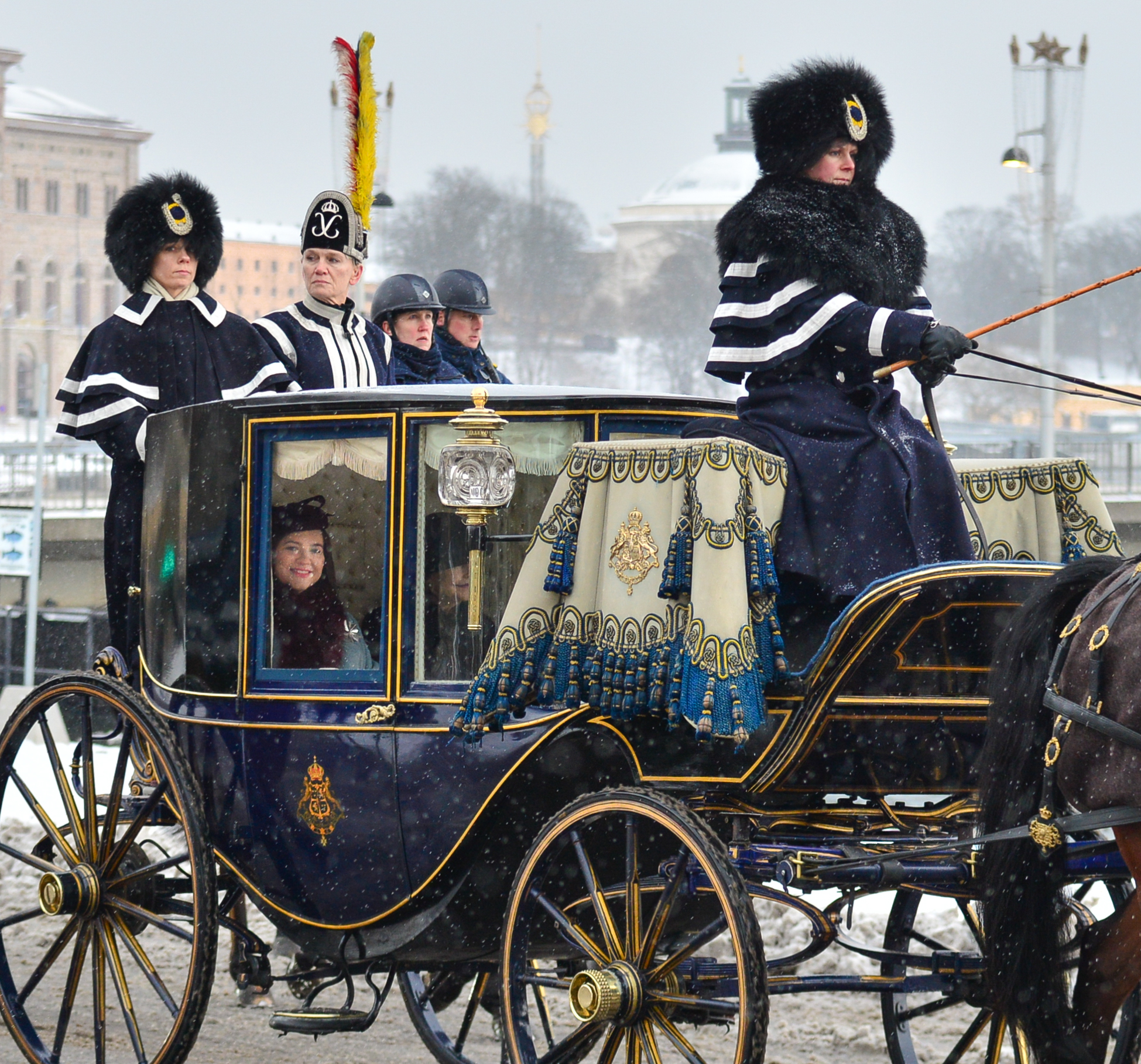
Reid rides with Queen Silvia of Sweden during a state visit in Stockholm in Sweden in 2018

Reid ran the summer student volunteer program at the Toronto Hospital for Sick Children in 1998, and volunteered for the Red Cross in Iceland. Reid later worked in sales from 1999 to 2003 and in marketing until 2004.

=== Writing ===
After her move to Iceland in 2003, Reid became a freelance writer for multiple Icelandic publications. She wrote for The Reykjavík Grapevine and Iceland Review from 2005 to 2008 and became an editor for Icelandair Stopover in 2012. She co-founded the Iceland Writers Retreat in 2014, an event which has garnered international acclaim.

She served on the jury of the 2018 British Columbia's National Award for Canadian Non-Fiction.

Reid has been nominated for 'Person of the Year' by multiple Icelandic media outlets.

In October 2020 her book Secrets of the Sprakkar: Iceland's Extraordinary Women and How They Are Changing the World was announced, and has been published by Sourcebooks in the US and Simon & Schuster in Canada in 2022. The book was well-received and gained endorsements from numerous high-profile authors, as well as from Hillary Clinton, and became a national bestseller in Canada.

In 2024 she published the murder mystery novel Death on the Island. In April 2025, Blink49 Studios and Truenorth announced that they had optioned the novel for development into a six-episode television limited series.

== Causes ==
She is patron of several organizations in Iceland, including the United Nations Association Iceland and is also a Goodwill Ambassador for SOS Children’s Villages Iceland. In September 2017, Reid visited the Za’atari refugee camp in Jordan at the invitation of UN Women. On March 23, 2019 she accepted an invitation to visit the Mosque in Iceland.

Reid loves to travel and has made solo-trips to many countries. In 2017, she was named a United Nations Special Ambassador for Tourism and the Sustainable Development Goals.

Reid has advocated for the recycling of clothing by making public appearances in clothing she purchased from local Red Cross stores. She has spoken on several occasions about her disdain for shopping.

=== Feminism and gender equality ===
Reid is known as a vocal proponent and advocate for women's rights and gender-parity. In 2019, she was honored in Berlin with an award on International Women's Day. On June 19, 2017, during the 102nd anniversary of women's right to vote in Iceland, Reid advocated for gender rights and acknowledged there is still much work for Iceland to do in this regard. In March 2018, Reid gave a keynote speech at the Young Women Business Leaders.

On 31 August 2019, Reid used her public Facebook page to respond to an opinion article by Zoe Williams in the British newspaper The Guardian, which criticized the media coverage of the spouses of global leaders attending the 2019 G7 conference, writing "I make a concerted effort not to be seen as an accessory to my husband". She has also been vocal about the undefined nature of being the partner of a head of state, and the perils and opportunities of that situation.

On 4 September 2019, Reid was the subject of political and media speculation for wearing a white pantsuit to a meeting with US Vice President Michael Pence and Second Lady Karen Pence in Reykjavik, which many saw as a symbol of solidarity with other global gender parity initiatives such as #TimesUp #MeToo and modern day Women's Rights and Suffragettes movements. She wore a rainbow bracelet on her wrist to the Pence meeting as well, which has been seen as a show of solidarity with the LGBTQA community. The President of Iceland wore a bracelet to the same meeting and has worn the bracelet to meetings with Vladimir Putin.

In October 2021, Reid directed attention to the marginalizing practices of the media, after they left her name off of a photo credit after the visit to Iceland by the Crown Prince of Denmark, asking "do women exist?"

=== Patronages ===
- Alzheimer's Society
- Eyrarrosin, an annual award for outstanding cultural projects in Iceland’s rural regions
- Ferskir Vindar art exhibition
- Pieta House for suicide- and self-harm prevention
- Society of Lung Patients
- SOS Children's Villages Iceland (Goodwill Ambassador)
- United Nations Association Iceland
- United Nations Special Ambassador for Tourism and the Sustainable Development Goals

== Personal life ==
In 2004, Reid married historian Guðni Th. Jóhannesson, who became President of Iceland in 2016. The couple have four children together. She is the sister of Canadian writer Iain Reid.

== Honours ==
=== Icelandic honours ===
- Grand Cross of the Order of the Falcon (1 August 2016)

=== Foreign honours ===
- Denmark: Grand Cross of the Order of the Dannebrog (24 January 2017)
- Finland: Grand Cross of the Order of the White Rose of Finland (31 May 2017)
- Germany: Grand Cross 1st class of the Order of Merit of the Federal Republic of Germany (12 June 2019)
- Norway: Grand Cross of the Royal Norwegian Order of Merit (21 March 2017)
- Sweden:
  - Member Grand Cross of the Order of the Polar Star (17 January 2018)
  - Recipient of the Commemorative Golden Jubilee Medal of His Majesty The King (15 September 2023)

Honorary titles
Preceded by Dorrit Moussaieff	First Lady of Iceland; 2016–2024	Vacant
