= Guðrún Katrín Þorbergsdóttir =

First Lady of Iceland from 1996 to 1998 (1934–1998)

First Lady of Iceland
- In role 1 August 1996 – 12 October 1998
- President: Ólafur Ragnar Grímsson
- Preceded by: Halldóra Eldjárn
- Succeeded by: Dorrit Moussaieff

Personal details
- Born: 14 August 1934 Reykjavík, Iceland
- Died: 12 October 1998 (aged 64) Seattle, Washington
- Spouse(s): Ólafur Ragnar Grímsson (1974–1998, her death)
- Children: 4

Guðrún Katrín Þorbergsdóttir (pronounced [ˈkvʏðrun ˈkʰaːtrin ˈθɔrpɛrksˌtouʰtɪr̥]; 14 August 1934 – 12 October 1998) was the First Lady of Iceland from 1996 to 1998. She was the first wife of Icelandic president Ólafur Ragnar Grímsson.

Guðrún Katrín studied archaeology and sociology. She was the General Manager of the Postal Workers Union for nearly 20 years, and managed a clothing store in downtown Reykjavík. She was also active in politics and held a city council post in the town of Seltjarnarnes for 16 years. She married Ólafur in 1974 and the following year gave birth to twin daughters, Guðrún Tinna and Svanhildur Dalla.

Guðrún Katrín was very popular in Iceland, and her charm and charisma are considered by many as one of the main reasons her husband was elected president of Iceland in June 1996. Guðrún Katrín was diagnosed with leukemia in September 1997. She spent the last few months of her life under the care of specialists in Seattle, Washington, with her family by her side, until her death in October 1998. Her death after a long and difficult struggle, at the age of 64, was a shock to her family and the Icelandic nation.

Honorary titles
Vacant Title last held by Halldóra Eldjárn	First Lady of Iceland; 1996–1998	Vacant Title next held by Dorrit Moussaieff
