= Geist (magazine) =

Canadian literary magazine

- Categories: Literary magazine, Canadian culture
- Frequency: Quarterly
- Circulation: 10,000
- Founder: Stephen Osborne
- First issue: 1990
- Company: The Geist Foundation
- Country: Canada
- Language: Canadian English
- Website: geist.com
- ISSN: 1181-6554

Geist is a Canadian literary magazine published quarterly since 1990. The magazine takes its name from the German word geist (meaning "mind" or "spirit").

Geist was co-founded in 1990 by Stephen Osborne and Mary Schendlinger in their living room, with financing of just $7,500. On April 20, 2015, Geist announced that Osborne and Schendlinger would be stepping down and staff members Michał Kozłowski and AnnMarie MacKinnon would be taking over.

The magazine is known in part for its series of Canadian maps (e.g. "Canadian placenames that sound impolite," "The Beer Map of Canada," etc.) and for spearheading various campaigns, such as petitions to have folk singer Stan Rogers inducted into the Canadian Music Hall of Fame and the Geist Annual Literal Literary Postcard Contest.

Geist has received numerous award nominations, including National Magazine Awards in 2010 and 2017. It won the 2017 Gold Medal for Photojournalism & Photo Essay for Terence Byrnes' South of Buck Creek. In 2019 Geist was nominated for two National Magazine Awards in the Personal Journalism and Column categories. Lisa Bird-Wilson won the Silver Column award for "Clowns, Cakes, Canoes: This is Canada?" Geist has been featured in the Utne Reader.

== Notable contributors ==
- David Albahari
- Lynn Coady
- Douglas Coupland
- Michael Crummey
- Ann Diamond
- George Fetherling
- Patrick Friesen
- Stephen Henighan
- Sheila Heti
- Edith Iglauer
- Evelyn Lau
- Annabel Lyon
- Alberto Manguel
- Yann Martel
- Sachiko Murakami
- Joseph Pearson
- Paul Quarrington
- J. Jill Robinson
- Moez Surani
- Souvankham Thammavongsa
- Miriam Toews
- Michel Tremblay
- Andrew Unger
- Joshua Whitehead
- Ian Williams
