= MagsBC =

MagsBC (also known as the British Columbia Association of Magazine Publishers (BCAMP)) is a member-run industry organization that meets the needs of British Columbia’s magazine publishing industry.

== Board and staff ==
As of 2012, the MagsBC Board and staff are composed of:

- President, Jenn Farrell, editorial collective member, SubTerrain
- Vice-President, Steve Ceron, publisher, Arrival
- Treasurer, Darren Bernaerdt, publisher, Pacific Rim Magazine
- Secretary, Stacey McLachlan, assistant editor, Western Living
- Directors-at-large

Kristin Cheung, managing editor, Ricepaper
Maia Odegaard, online coordinator and administrative assistant, TC Transcontinental
Gary Davies, president, Canada Wide Media Ltd.

- Staff

Sylvia Skene, executive director

== Events ==
Word on the Street, Vancouver, September 2009
BC Book and Magazine Week, Vancouver, April 18–25, 2009
