= Dorrit Moussaieff =

Israeli jewelry designer, editor and businesswoman (born 1950)

- דורית מוסאיוף
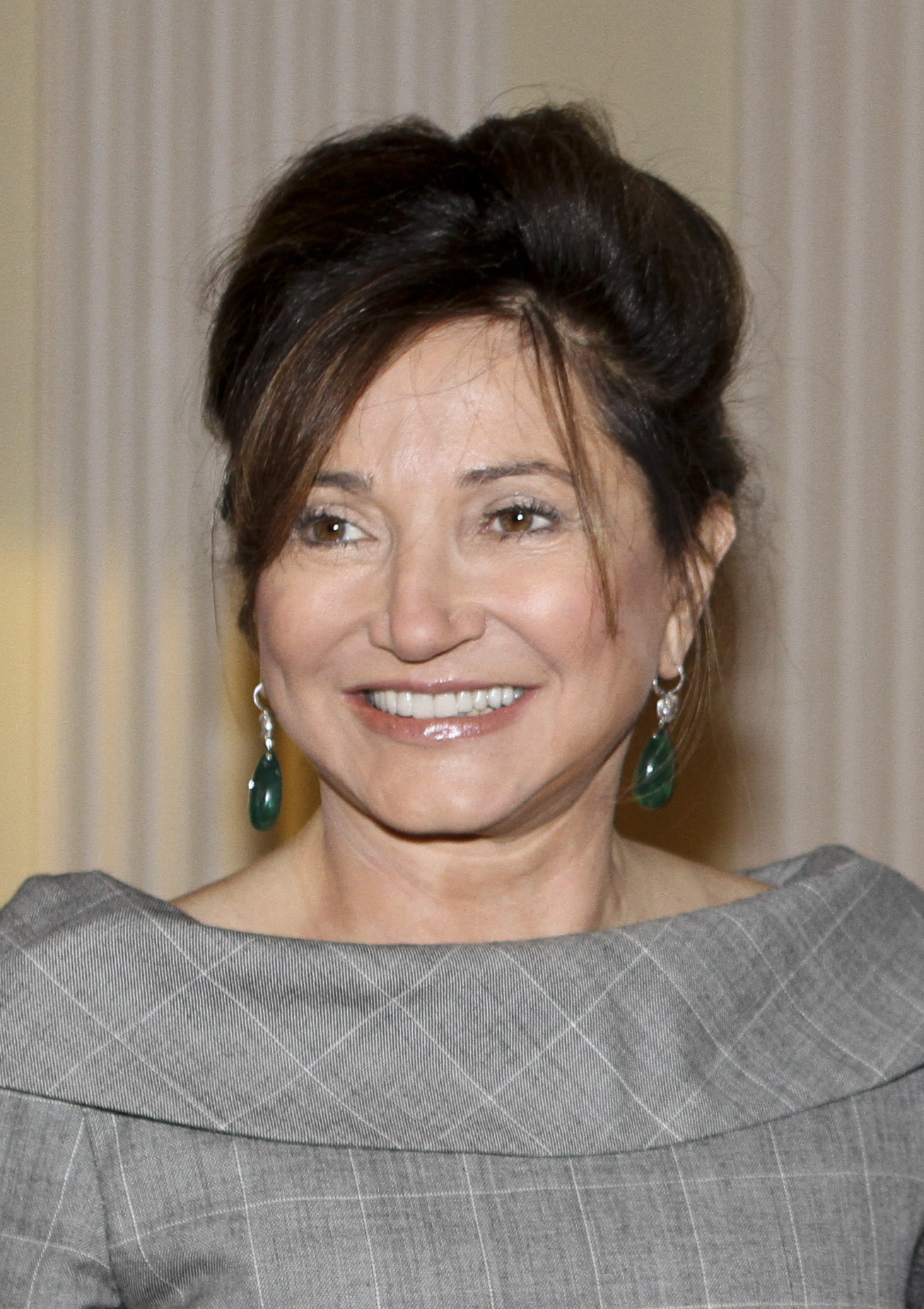
- Moussaieff in 2012

First Lady of Iceland
- In role 14 May 2003 – 1 August 2016
- President: Ólafur Ragnar Grímsson
- Preceded by: Guðrún Katrín Þorbergsdóttir
- Succeeded by: Eliza Reid

Personal details
- Born: 12 January 1950 (age 76) Jerusalem, Israel
- Citizenship: Israel; United Kingdom; Iceland
- Spouses: Neil Zarach (divorced): Ólafur Ragnar Grímsson (divorced)
- Parent: Shlomo Moussaieff (father)
- Relatives: Shlomo Moussaieff (great-grandfather)

Dorrit Moussaieff (Hebrew: דורית מוסאיוף; born 12 January 1950) is an Israeli jewellery designer, editor, and businesswoman who was the First Lady of Iceland from 2003 to 2016. Born in Israel, she was raised in the United Kingdom from the age of 13.

== Biography ==
Dorrit Moussaieff was born in Jerusalem, Israel. Her father, Shlomo Moussaieff, was from a wealthy Bukharian Jewish family from Bukhara, Uzbekistan, part of a long dynasty of jewelers. Dorrit is the great-granddaughter of Rabbi Shlomo Moussaieff. Ancestors of hers are said to have woven the robe of Genghis Khan. Her great-grandmother, Esther Gaonoff, was a descendant of Yosef Maimon. Her mother, Alisa, is an Austrian Jew of Ashkenazi heritage, but Dorrit identifies more with Bukharian culture and was raised by her father.

Moussaieff was born and raised in the Bukharan Quarter of Jerusalem. At age 13, she moved with her family to London. She had dyslexia and was home-schooled. In addition to English and Hebrew, she also speaks German, French, and Icelandic.

Moussaieff describes herself as "religious in the soul" and continues to observe Jewish rituals, such as lighting Hanukkah candles.

== Business and media career ==
As a child, Moussaieff spent a lot of time in her family's jewellery store on Hilton Park Lane in London, and went on to become a successful jewellery designer. Other business ventures in which she has been involved are the construction of an office building at Canary Wharf, London and a tourism project in Northern Cyprus. Moussaieff is a contributing editor to the British society magazine Tatler.

== First Lady of Iceland ==
In 2003, Moussaieff married President Ólafur Ragnar Grímsson on his 60th birthday. She has helped present Icelandic culture abroad, promoted Icelandic artists and identified foreign markets for Icelandic products. She is also active in raising money for disabled children.

== Controversy ==
In May 2006, while visiting Israel, Moussaieff was detained at Ben Gurion International Airport after arguing with security personnel who refused to acknowledge her British passport and told her that she was obliged by Israeli law to enter and exit the country using her Israeli passport. The media related the confrontation as a diplomatic incident. The Israeli Embassy in Norway, which handles diplomatic relations with Iceland, expressed regret over the incident and restated the law that Israeli citizens must carry Israeli passports when in the country. Following the incident she applied for Icelandic citizenship which she received on 31 July 2006.

In 2016, leaked files linked Moussaieff to offshore companies and trusts, suggesting that she may have been evading paying her taxes. Her lawyers claimed that, "her business interests were always carried out legally and they were a private matter."

== Awards and honors ==
=== Honours ===
==== Foreign honours ====
- Sweden: Member Grand Cross of the Royal Order of the Polar Star
- Sweden: Recipient of the Ruby Jubilee Badge Medal of King Carl XVI Gustaf
- Sweden: Recipient of the 70th Birthday Badge Medal of King Carl XVI Gustaf

=== Awards ===
Moussaieff was listed third on the Harper's Magazine List of the Most Connected People in Britain. A local magazine in Reykjavík chose her as one of the best-dressed women in Iceland. Moussaieff was also named Woman of 2006 by the popular Icelandic glossy magazine Nýtt Líf.

== Personal life ==
Moussaieff's first husband was Neil Zarach, a Jewish designer. The marriage ended in divorce. In 2003, Moussaieff married the President of Iceland, Ólafur Ragnar Grímsson, on his birthday, 14 May 2003, following an engagement of three years.

Honorary titles
Vacant Title last held by Guðrún Katrín Þorbergsdóttir	First Lady of Iceland; 2003–2016	Succeeded by Eliza Reid
