= List of spouses and partners of Icelandic presidents =

This is a list of spouses and partners of Icelandic presidents. Björn Skúlason is the spouse of incumbent president Halla Tómasdóttir.

== List ==
† – denotes that the person died while the president was in office

Spouse or partner	President	Duration
Georgia Björnsson	Sveinn Björnsson	1944–1952
Dóra Þórhallsdóttir	Ásgeir Ásgeirsson	1952–1964†
Spouse died	Ásgeir Ásgeirsson	1964–1968
Halldóra Eldjárn	Kristján Eldjárn	1968–1980
Divorced	Vigdís Finnbogadóttir	1980–1996
Guðrún Katrín Þorbergsdóttir	Ólafur Ragnar Grímsson	1996–1998†
Spouse died	Ólafur Ragnar Grímsson	1998 – 14 May 2003
Dorrit Moussaieff	Ólafur Ragnar Grímsson	14 May 2003 – 1 August 2016
Eliza Reid	Guðni Th. Jóhannesson	1 August 2016 – 1 August 2024
Björn Skúlason	Halla Tómasdóttir	1 August 2024 – present
