= List of Asian Jews =

Jews have been present in Asia since the beginning of their history. Some examples of ancient Jewish communities in the Mediterranean and Iran (Persian Jews) and Iraq (Iraqi Jews); the Georgian Jews, Bukharian Jews, and Mountain Jews.

Through the centuries, they also established Jewish communities in eastern parts of Asia. There are some Jews who migrated to India, establishing the Bene Israel, the Baghdadi Jews and the Cochin Jews of India (Jews in India); and the former Jewish community in Kaifeng, China.

Here is a partial list of some prominent Asian Jews, arranged by country. Those regions of Asia where Arabic or Russian or Turkish predominate are excluded from this list (except for the Baghdadi Jews from India and Southeast Asia); see Middle Eastern Jews, Ashkenazi Jews and Sephardi Jews for information on these populations.

== Armenia ==
- Levon Aronian, Armenian chess player (part Jewish)

== Azerbaijan ==
- Misha Black, designer
- Bella Davidovich, pianist
- Gavril Abramovich Ilizarov, Soviet physician, known for inventing the Ilizarov apparatus
- Lev Landau, physicist, Nobel Prize (1962). Russian-speaking Ashkenazi.
- Lev Nussimbaum, writer (a.k.a. Kurban Said)
- Vladimir Rokhlin, mathematician. Russian-speaking Ashkenazi.

== Afghanistan ==
A small community of Jews lived mainly in Herat, Afghanistan and Kabul, but they emigrated to Israel, Europe and the United States. In September 2021, the last remaining Jew in Afghanistan, Zablon Simintov, fled Afghanistan's capital Kabul in response to the Taliban takeover several weeks prior.

== China ==
- Morris Cohen, bodyguard of Sun Yat-Sen
- Misha Dichter, pianist (China-born)
- Israel Epstein, journalist, author
- Edmond Fischer, biochemist, Nobel Prize (1992)
- Jakob Rosenfeld, doctor and general in the People's Liberation Army
- Sidney Shapiro, member of the People's Political Consultative Council
- Zhao Yingcheng, (Hebrew: Moshe ben Abram), Ming dynasty mandarin

== Georgia ==
- David Baazov, Zionist activist and rabbi
- Ioseb Bardanashvili, composer
- Roman Dzindzichashvili, American chess player
- Yasha Manasherov, Israeli Greco-Roman wrestler
- Mikhael Mirilashvili, businessman and philanthropist
- Tamir Sapir, businessman and investor
- Gocha Tsitsiashvili, Israeli Greco-Roman wrestler

== Hong Kong ==
- Ellis, Elly, Lawrence, and Michael Kadoorie, businesspeople
- Matthew Nathan, Hong Kong governor (1904)
- Victor Sassoon, businessman and hotelier

== India ==
- Sarah Avraham, Indian-born Israeli, 2014 women's world Thai kickboxing champion
- Joseph Rabban, given copper plates of special grants from the Chera ruler Bhaskara Ravivarman II from Kerala in South India
- David Abraham Cheulkar, actor
- Nissim Ezekiel, poet
- J F R Jacob, former Governor of Punjab and Goa; the Chief of Staff of the Indian Army's Eastern Command
- Gerry Judah, artist and designer
- Anish Kapoor, sculptor (Baghdadi Jewish mother, Indian father)
- Samson Kehimkar, musician
- Ezekiel Isaac Malekar, Bene Israel Rabbi
- Pearl Padamsee, theatre personality (part Jewish)
- David and Simon Reuben, businessmen
- Nadira, actress of the 1950s and 1960s.
- David Sassoon, businessman
- Albert Abdullah David Sassoon (1818 – 24 October 1896), British-Indian merchant
- Sassoon David Sassoon (August 1832 – 23 June 1867), Indian-born British businessman and philanthropist
- Solomon Sopher, Jewish community leader
- Eli Ben-Menachem, Indian-born Israeli politician
- Ellis Kadoorie and Elly Kadoorie, philanthropists
- Horace Kadoorie, philanthropist
- Ruby Myers, Bollywood actress of the 1920s, otherwise known as Sulochana
- Lalchanhima Sailo, rabbi
- Abraham Barak Salem, Cochin Jew Indian nationalist leader
- Bensiyon Songavkar, professional cricketer

== Indonesia ==
- Carmel Budiarjo, Human rights activist, lecturer, and author, founder of Tapol
- Cosman Citroen, Prominent colonial era architect, designer of Lawang Sewu
- Dolly Zegerius, Contract Bridge Athlete
- J.B.A.F. Polak, Former Member of the House of Representatives, Politician from the Socialist Party of Indonesia
- Nafa Urbach, Indonesian soap opera actress, singer, and politician.
- Yapto Soerjosoemarno, founder and leader of the Pancasila Youth (partly Jewish descent)
- Sophia Latjuba, Indonesian actress

== Iran ==
=== Biblical era ===
- Daniel
- Esther
- Ezra
- Habakkuk
- Haggai
- Mordechai
- Nehemiah
- Zerubbabel

=== Pre-modern era ===
- Mashallah ibn Athari – Persian astrologer and astronomer
- Sahl ibn Bishr, nine-century astrologer, astronomer, and mathematician
- Sa'ad al-Dawla (c. 1240 – March 5, 1291) – physician and statesman
- Rashid al-Din – doctor, writer, and historian
- Benjamin Nahawandi – Karaite scholar of the early Middle Ages
- Meulana Shahin Shirazi – early Persian poet
- Muhammad ibn Muhammad Tabrizi – philosopher and translator, converted to Islam
- Munabbih ibn Kamil – a companion of Muhammad, converted to Islam
- Abu Ubaidah – religious scholar
- Ibn al-Rawandi – philosopher, religious scholar
- Shushandukht – Sassanian queen consort, mother of Bahram V
- Ifra Hormizd – Sassanid noblewoman, mother of Shapur II
- Maryam Khanom – Qajar royal consort
- Masarjawaih – Persian physician and translator
- Abu Isa – self-proclaimed Jewish prophet
- Mar-Zutra II – Jewish exilarch
- Qavam family – one of the most influential families during the Qajar dynasty
- Imrani – Persian poet
- Yudghan – religious leader from Hamadan
- Baba'i ben Lotf – Persian poet, author of the first Judeo-Persian chronicle
- Baba'i ben Farhad - 2nd Judeo-Persian chronicler
- Anan ben David – founder of the Karaite Movement
- Daniel al-Kumisi – scholar of Karaite Judaism
- Aphrahat – Persian saint, converted to Christianity

=== Politics and military ===
- David Alliance, Baron Alliance – Iranian-born British businessman; Liberal Democrat politician
- Michael Ben-Ari – Israeli politician and former member of the Knesset
- Makan Delrahim – United States Assistant Attorney General for the United States Department of Justice Antitrust Division under the Trump Administration
- Jimmy Delshad – Iranian-American former two-term mayor of Beverly Hills, California
- Manuchehr Eliasi – former Jewish member of the Majlis
- Eitan Ben Eliyahu – former Major General in the Israeli Defence Forces
- Saeed Emami – former conservative Deputy Minister of the Ministry of Intelligence (alleged by critics to have Jewish ancestry)
- Naser Makarem Shirazi – Iranian Shia religious leader (alleged by a critic to have Jewish ancestry)
- Reza Hekmat – Prime Minister of Iran (alleged to have Iranian Jewish ancestry)
- Aziz Daneshrad – political activist
- Dan Halutz – former chief of staff of the Israel Defense Forces
- Anna Kaplan (née Monahemi) – Iranian-born American politician and member of the New York State Senate
- Moshe Katsav – former President of Israel
- Shaul Mofaz – former Israeli Minister of Defense, Minister of Transportation
- Maurice Motamed – former Jewish member of the Majlis of Iran
- David Nahai – Iranian-American former head of the Los Angeles Department of Water and Power
- Abie Nathan – Israeli humanitarian and peace activist
- Siamak Moreh Sedgh – Jewish member of the Majlis of Iran
- Haroun Yashayaei – chairman of the board of the Tehran Jewish Committee and leader of Iran's Jewish community
- Mordechai Zar – Israeli politician and former member of the Knesset
- Ellie Cohanim – Deputy Special Envoy to Monitor and Combat Anti-Semitism at the United States Department of State
- Dalya Attar – American politician
- Moshfegh Hamadani – political journalist
- Tali Farhadian – Iranian-born American attorney and politician
- Esther Shkalim – Israeli poet, researcher
- Shmuel Hayyim – journalist, politician
- Shula Keshet – Israeli political activist and writer
- Nitsana Darshan-Leitner – Israeli attorney, activist
- Meirav Ben-Ari – Israeli politician, member of the Knesset
- Sharon Nazarian – Iranian-born Senior Vice President of International Affairs for the ADL
- David Rokni – Israeli colonel
- Galit Distel-Atbaryan – Israeli politician, member of the Knesset
- Eliezer Avtabi – former Israeli politician
- Sharon Roffe Ofir – Israeli journalist and politician
- Payam Akhavan – Iranian-born Canadian international lawyer (convert to the Bahá'í faith)
- David Peyman – attorney, worked for the United States Department of State

=== Science and academia ===
- Abbas Amanat – Iranian-born American professor of history at Yale University (born to a family of Jewish descent)
- Shaul Bakhash – Iranian-American professor of Iranian studies at George Mason University
- Aaron Cohen-Gadol – American neurosurgeon specializing in surgical treatment of brain tumors and aneurysms
- Farshid Delshad – historical-comparative linguistics in German
- Pejman Salimpour – professor, physician
- Pedram Salimpour – Iranian-American physician, entrepreneur
- Avshalom Elitzur – physicist and philosopher
- Soleiman Haim – compiled an early and influential Persian language dictionary
- Hakim Yazghel Haqnazar – court physician
- Iraj Lalezari – academic and chemist
- Habib Levy – historian best known for his extensive research on the history of Jews in Iran; author of Comprehensive History of the Jews of Iran: The Outset of the Diaspora.
- Amnon Netzer – professor of the history and culture of Iranian Jews
- Samuel Rahbar – discoverer of HbA1C
- David B. Samadi – expert in robotic oncology
- Saba Soomekh – professor of religious studies and Middle Eastern History at UCLA, and author of books on Iranian Jewish culture
- Moussa B. H. Youdim – Israeli neurologist, neuropharmacologist
- Armin Tehrany – orthopedic surgeon
- Sheila Nazarian – Iranian-American plastic surgeon and television personality
- Simon Ourian – Iranian-American plastic surgeon
- Ehsan Yarshater – historian & founder of the Encyclopedia Iranica (born to Jewish parents who converted to the Baháʼí faith)

=== Business and economics ===
- David Alliance – British businessman
- Mike Amiri – American fashion designer
- Asadollah Asgaroladi – Iranian billionaire (convert to Islam)
- Habibollah Asgaroladi – leading Iranian conservative politician (convert to Islam)
- Jon Bakhshi – American restaurateur
- J. Darius Bikoff – founder and CEO of Energy Brands
- Mandana Dayani – Iranian-American attorney, entrepreneur
- Henry Elghanayan – real estate developer New York City
- Habib Elghanian – businessman executed by the Islamic Republic
- Ghermezian family – billionaire shopping mall developers
- Manucher Ghorbanifar – former SAVAK agent, central figure in the Iran–Contra affair
- Kamran Hakim – real estate developer in New York City
- Moussa Kermanian – real estate developer in Los Angeles and journalist
- Neil Kadisha – businessman
- Nasser David Khalili – billionaire property developer and art collector
- Saul Maslavi – president and CEO of Jovani Fashion
- Isaac Larian – American billionaire, chief executive officer of MGA Entertainment
- Justin Mateen – co-founder and former chief marketing officer of Tinder dating app
- David Merage – co-founder of Hot Pockets snack food company
- Paul Merage – co-founder of Hot Pockets snack food company
- Joseph Moinian – New York City real estate developer
- Ezri Namvar – Iranian-born businessman and convicted criminal
- Fred Ohebshalom – founder of Empire Management Real Estate
- Joseph Parnes – investment advisor
- Erwin David Rabhan – businessman, longtime friend of Jimmy Carter
- Sean Rad – co-founder and former CEO of Tinder dating app
- Assadollah Rashidian – businessman, played a critical role in the 1953 Overthrow of Mohammed Mossadegh
- Nouriel Roubini – economist
- Ben Shaoul – co-founder of Magnum Real Estate Group
- Joel Simkhai – founder of Grindr dating app
- Mahbod Moghadam – co-founder of Everipedia, co-founder of Genius
- Sam Mizrahi – Canadian real estate developer
- Victor Haghani – American financier
- Fraydun Manocherian – Manhattan real estate developer
- Richard Saghian – founder of Fashion Nova
- Mike Kohan – founder of Kohan Retail Investment Group
- Habib Sabet – Iranian industrialist (convert to the Bahá'í faith)
- Essie Sakhai – art dealer, businessman
- Ely Sakhai – art dealer, owner of several Lower Manhattan art galleries
- Sasson Khakshouri – businessman, founder of the international Kremlin Cup
- Jack Mahfar – Iranian-born Swiss businessman
- Albert Hakim – Iranian-American businessman, figure in the Iran–Contra affair
- Sam Eshaghoff – American real estate developer
- Eli Zelkha – Iranian-American entrepreneur, venture capitalist, professor, and inventor of ambient intelligence

=== Art and entertainment ===
- Isaac Larian – Iranian-born American creator of Bratz dolls
- Dan Ahdoot – American stand-up comedian
- Jonathan Ahdout – American actor
- Hossein Amanat – architect, designer of the Azadi Tower in Tehran (born to a family of Jewish descent that converted to the Baháʼí faith)
- Jojo Anavim – American artist
- Yossi Banai – Israeli performer, singer, and actor
- Richard Danielpour – American composer
- Yuval Delshad – Israeli film director
- David Diaan – actor, producer, screenwriter
- Irán Eory – Iranian-born Mexican actress and model
- Chohreh Feyzdjou – French-Iranian painter
- Hamid Gabbay – Iranian-born architect
- Roya Hakakian – Iranian-American writer and poet
- Mor Karbasi – Israeli singer-songwriter
- Kamran Khavarani – Iranian-American architect, painter
- Harmony Korine – director, screenwriter
- Ben Maddahi – American music executive
- Faranak Margolese – American-Israeli writer, best known as author of Off the Derech
- Jamie Masada – comedian and businessman. Founder of the Laugh Factory
- Heshmat Moayyad – writer, translator (convert to Bahá'í faith)
- Dora Levy Mossanen – author of historical fiction
- Moze Mossanen – Canadian film director and producer
- Ottessa Moshfegh – American author
- Gina Nahai – writer
- Morteza Neidavoud – musician
- Adi Nes – Israeli photographer
- Dorit Rabinyan – Israeli writer, screenwriter
- Rita – Israeli pop star singer/actress
- Maer Roshan – Iranian-American writer, entrepreneur
- Hooshang Seyhoun – architect (convert to the Bahá'í faith)
- Lior Shamriz – filmmaker
- Shahram Shiva – performance poet
- Dalia Sofer – writer
- Sarah Solemani – English actress
- Bahar Soomekh – Iranian-born American actress
- Tami Stronach – choreographer
- Subliminal – Israeli hip-hop singer
- The Shadow – Israeli hip-hop singer and right-wing activist
- Elie Tahari – Israeli-American high-end fashion designer
- Jeremey Tahari – businessperson, real estate broker
- Shaun Toub – Iranian-born American actor, recipient of the Sephard award at the Los Angeles Sephardic Film Festival
- Elham Yaghoubian - writer
- Bob Yari – film producer

=== Religious figures ===
- Eliyahu Bakshi-Doron – previous Sephardic Chief Rabbi of Israel
- Shmuley Boteach – American rabbi
- Yousef Hamadani Cohen – former chief rabbi of Iran
- Moses ben Hanoch, rabbi
- Uriel Davidi – former chief rabbi of Iran
- Lutfu'lláh Hakím – Baháʼí leader (born to a family of Jewish descent that converted to the Baháʼí faith)
- Menahem Shemuel Halevy – Iranian rabbi
- Yedidia Shofet – former chief rabbi of Iran
- Younes Hamami Lalehzar – rabbi
- Eliyahu Ben Haim – Sephardic rabbi
- Ben Zion Abba Shaul – rabbi, religious scholar
- Ezra Zion Melamed – biblical scholar

=== Sports ===
- Soleyman Binafard – wrestler
- Ezra Frech – American Paralympic athlete
- Janet Kohan-Sedq – track and field athlete

=== Miscellaneous ===
- Menashe Amir – Persian-language broadcaster in Israel
- Hanina Mizrahi – educator, public figure
- Shamsi Hekmat – women's rights activist who pioneered reforms on women's status in Iran. Founded the first Iranian Jewish women's organization (Sazman Banovan Yahud i Iran) in 1947.
- Leandra Medine – author, blogger, and humor writer best known for Man Repeller, an independent fashion and lifestyle website
- Homa Sarshar –Iranian-American journalist, author, and feminist activist. Columnist for Zan-e-Ruz magazine Kayhan daily newspaper (1964–1973)
- Albert Elay Shaltiel – philanthropist, founder and director of ILAI Fund
- Houshang Mashian – Iranian-Israeli chess master
- Eliezer Kashani – member of Irgun
- Eli Avivi – founder of the micronation Akhzivland

== Japan ==
- Alfred Birnbaum
- Dan Calichman
- Julie Dreyfus
- Rachel Elior
- Ofer Feldman, University professor
- Péter Frankl, Hungarian mathematician
- Shaul Eisenberg, businessman
- Martin "Marty" Adam Friedman, rock guitarist
- Ayako Fujitani, writer and actress, convert
- Szymon Goldberg
- David G. Goodman, Japanologist
- Karl Taro Greenfeld, journalist and author
- Manfred Gurlitt
- Jack Halpern, Israeli linguist, Kanji-scholar
- Shifra Horn
- Hoshitango Imachi, né Imachi Marcelo Salomon
- Chaim Janowski
- Max Janowski
- Charles Louis Kades
- Rena "Rusty" Kanokogi, née Glickman
- Abraham Kaufman
- Michael Kogan, founder of Taito
- Fumiko Kometani, author and artist, convert
- Setsuzo (Avraham) Kotsuji, Hebrew professor, convert
- Leonid Kreutzer, pianist
- Yaacov Liberman
- Henryk Lipszyc
- Leza Lowitz, American Japanologist
- Alan Merrill
- Sulamith Messerer
- Emmanuel Metter
- Albert Mosse
- John Nathan
- Emil Orlík
- Klaus Pringsheim Sr.
- Roger Pulvers
- Ludwig Riess
- Joseph Rosenstock, conductor of the NHK Symphony Orchestra
- Jay Rubin
- Arie Selinger
- Ben-Ami Shillony, Israeli Japanologist
- Kurt Singer
- Beate Sirota Gordon, former Performing Arts Director of Japan Society and Asia Society
- Leo Sirota
- Zerach Warhaftig

Refugees, short expatriates

- Moshe Atzmon
- George W. F. Hallgarten
- Albert Kahn (banker)
- Mirra Alfassa
- Emil Lederer
- Karl Löwith
- Norman Mailer
- Leo Melamed
- Franz Oppenheimer
- Samuel Isaac Joseph Schereschewsky (Christian)
- Hayyim Selig Slonimski

Other related people to Judaism and Jews in Japan

- Hana Brady, and George Brady
- Jeremy Glick
- Lili Kraus
- Samuel Ullman

=== Ambassadors ===
- Eli Cohen

== Kazakhstan ==
- Alexander Mashkevich, businessman (Kyrgyz-born)

== Philippines ==
- Bruno Mars, singer and songwriter.
- Emil Bachrach, industrialist, airline and airplane pioneer.

== Singapore ==
- David Marshall, first Chief Minister of Singapore, founder and first chairman of the main opposition party the Workers' Party of Singapore
- Harry Elias, lawyer, founder of the Harry Elias Partnership LLP
- Joseph Grimberg, prominent lawyer and a former judge of the Supreme Court of Singapore
- Manasseh Meyer, businessman and philanthropist who was a benefactor to the Jewish community in Singapore.

== Sri Lanka ==
- Sidney Abrahams, Chief Justice
- Hedi Keuneman, political activist
- Anne Ranasinghe, poet
- Leonard Woolf, British administrative officer and author, later married author Virginia

== Tajikistan ==
- Rena Galibova, actress, "People's Artist of Tajikistan"
- Meirkhaim Gavrielov, journalist and political opposition leader
- Malika Kalantarova, dancer, "People's Artist of Soviet Union"
- Fatima Kuinova, singer, "Merited Artist of the Soviet Union"
- Shoista Mullodzhanova, shashmakon singer, "People's Artist of Tajikistan" (viewed as the Queen of Tajik music)
- Moses Znaimer, TV producer
- Rus Yusupov, designer and tech entrepreneur.

== Uzbekistan ==
- Ari Babakhanov, musician
- Yefim Bronfman, pianist
- Lev Leviev, diamond tycoon
- Ilyas Malayev, musician and poet
- Shlomo Moussaieff (businessman), Israeli businessman
- Shlomo Moussaieff (rabbi), co-founder of the Bukharian Quarter in Jerusalem
- Gavriel Mullokandov, shashmakom artist, "People's Artist of Uzbekistan"
- Suleiman Yudakov, composer and musician, "People's Artist of the Soviet Union"

== See also ==
- List of Jews
- Jewish Autonomous Oblast
- List of Jews from the Arab World

== Bibliography ==
- Rubinstein, William D. (22 February 2011). The Palgrave Dictionary of Anglo-Jewish History. Palgrave Macmillan. ISBN 9780230304666.
