= History of the Jews in Japan =

Japanese Jews
日本のユダヤ人 יהודים יפנים
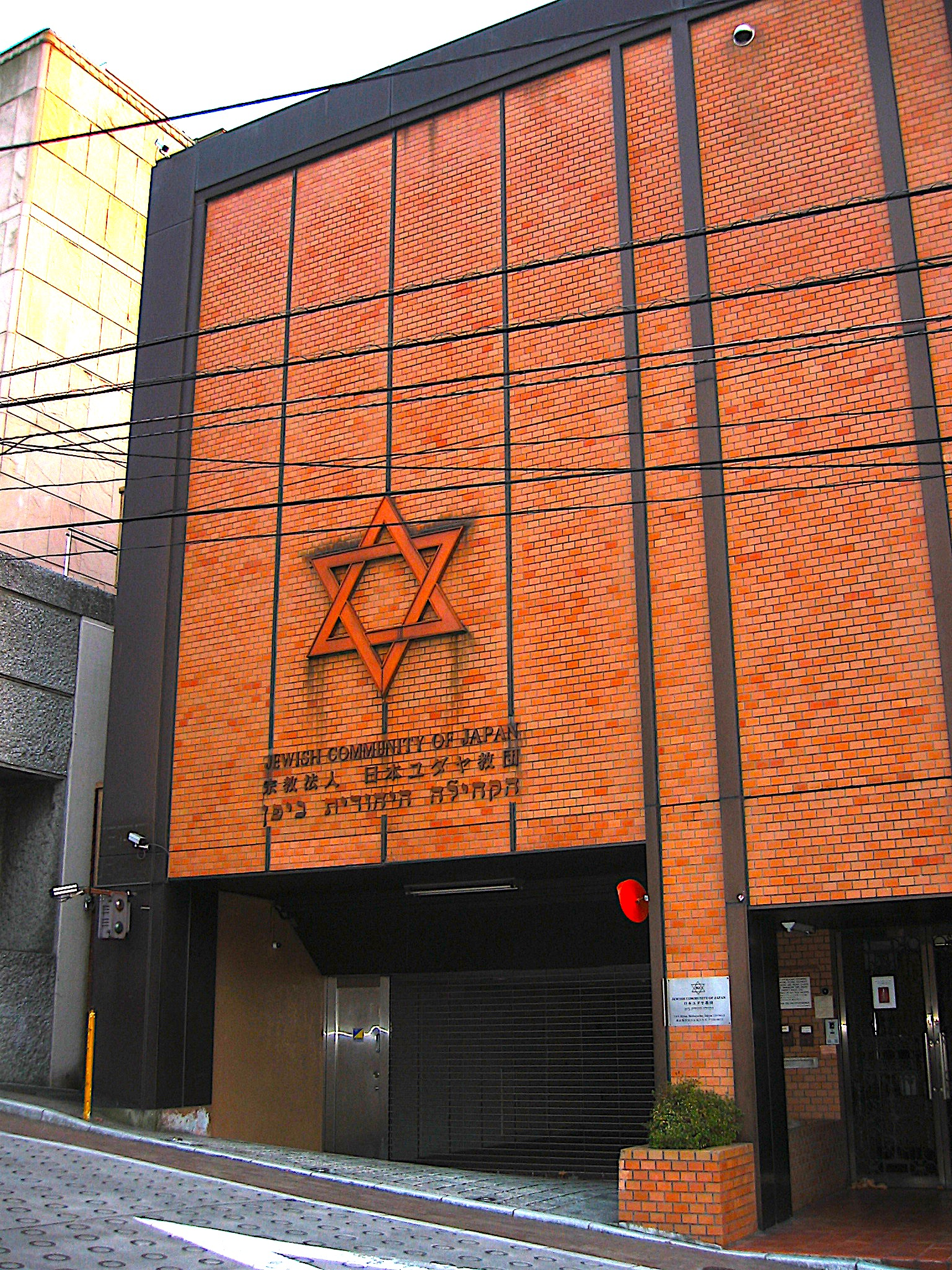
- Jewish community center in Tokyo

Total population
- 2,000 – 4,000

Regions with significant populations
- Kobe, Kansai region; Tokyo, Kantō region

Languages
- English, Hebrew, Japanese, Yiddish

Religion
- Judaism

Related ethnic groups
- Israelis

The location of Japan in Asia.

The history of the Jews in Japan reaches back to the 16th century and maintained a sporadic presence to the modern day. Early Jews in Japan arrived with the Portuguese in the 16th century and were often sailors and tradesmen. There was a small Jewish community during the early and mid-20th century which saw some growth as Jewish refugees fled persecution or political turmoil and settled in Japan. In the aftermath of World War II, many Japanese Jews moved to Israel and the population has significantly decreased since. Most Jews in present Japan are expatriates or temporary residents.

== Early settlements ==
The earliest known Jews to arrive in Japan appeared along with the Portuguese around 1543. These included Jewish seamen displaced to Spanish controlled Naples and Jews converted to Catholicism during the 1492 Spanish expulsion. Later some remained in the trading post on Dejima. In 1587, some of these settlers were displaced further into Japan, at least one known Jewish merchant arrived into the Yodo river in Kinki Region, where a Christian presence already existed.

Recent Jewish settlers were located in Yokohama. By 1895, this community had about fifty families, and dedicated the first synagogue in the country. Jews also settled in Nagasaki during the 1880s, which, as a significant port town, was more accessible to Jews fleeing Russian pogroms.

Although the Jewish community in Nagasaki was much larger than the one in Yokohama, the effects of the Russo-Japanese War resulted in them largely disintegrating and passing on their Torah scroll to the Jewish community in Kobe. Until 1923, the Jewish community in Yokohama became the largest, however after the 1923 Great Kantō earthquake, many relocated to Kobe, resulting in the Kobe Jewish community growing significantly.

The Jewish community in Kobe in the early to mid 1900s consisted mainly of Russian, German, and Baghdadi Jews from what is currently Iraq, Syria, Yemen, Iran, and other places in Central Asia and the Middle East. Jewish people from Central and Eastern Europe came to Japan for economic reasons, and in the 1930s, the developments in the continent.

The Jewish community in Tokyo was small until after World War II, during the American occupation of Japan and afterwards. The Jewish community in Nagasaki ended in 1945.

== World War II ==
Antisemitism in Japan rose after World War I, in part due to the reaction to the October Revolution in Russia. Despite this, the Japanese government cooperated with Jewish communities in aiding Jewish refugees of Russia after this revolution. In the 1930s, antisemitism became more prevalent, due to pacts signed with Germany in 1936 and 1940, as well as propaganda campaigns to turn the Japanese public against the "Jewish peril".

Attitudes towards Jewish people were not uniform among individual diplomats and politicians, with many attempting to combat antisemitism, and stating that Japan owed Jewish people due to their participation in the Russo-Japanese War.

Japanese diplomat Chiune Sugihara issued transit visas to Polish and Jewish refugees. While the exact number of visas issued is unknown, it is estimated that he helped five thousand to six thousand Jews escape via Japan.

During World War II, Japanese policy towards Jewish people was that those holding citizenship of a country would be afforded the same treatment as those from that country, and Jewish people designated as stateless — typically German and Polish Jews who had their citizenship revoked — were placed under surveillance due to their racial characteristics, similarly to their treatment of Russians.

While there were individual incidents of harassment and some Jews were held in detention camps in Japan occupied Malaya, throughout the duration of the war, Jewish people as a whole were treated no worse than citizens of neutral countries. One exception was the request for French Indochina to institute similar restrictions of Jews to citizens of neutral countries with anti-Axis views.

The main problem facing Jewish people in Japan and Japan occupied territories, such as Shanghai, was the shortage of supplies and money for refugees.

View of Beth Israel Synagogue in Nagasaki

== Post-war ==
The immediate post-war period dramatically reshaped the Jewish community in Japan, with the demographic focus shifting from Kobe to Tokyo. While Kobe had been the main center for pre-war settlers (primarily Russian, Baghdadi, and German refugees), its Jewish population dwindled significantly as many left for Israel, the United States, or other destinations after the war. In contrast, Tokyo's Jewish presence was initially dominated by American Jewish servicemen and their chaplains stationed there during the Allied Occupation (1945–1952). This period also saw a "fourth wave" of Jewish immigration, consisting mostly of Russian Jews who fled the Chinese Civil War and the subsequent Communist takeover in China, settling in Tokyo. This new influx spurred the establishment of an organized Jewish life in the capital, which had previously been marginal.

The organization of the modern Jewish community in Tokyo solidified in the early 1950s. The Jewish Community Center (JCC), now known as the Jewish Community of Japan (JCJ) , was founded in 1951, initially as a social club by the Russian Jewish emigrés who had settled from China. It quickly evolved and became affiliated with the World Jewish Congress in 1953, opening a permanent community center that same year. The center provided a focus for religious, educational, and social activities. The community's establishment was notable for being welcomed by high-ranking Japanese officials, including Prince Mikasa, the brother of Emperor Hirohito, a known philosemite and scholar of Semitic languages. The JCC later became a full-service religious institution with a synagogue and mikveh (ritual bath) added in 1968.

Since its formal establishment, the Jewish Community of Japan has remained relatively small but vibrant, primarily consisting of expatriates, including Israelis and Americans, working for foreign businesses and banks. The population is characterized by a high turnover, as most members stay for only a few years. Despite this transience, the JCJ in Tokyo remains the central hub of Jewish life. Kobe also maintains a smaller, historically significant Jewish Community of Kansai, with the Ohel Shelomoh synagogue. In more recent decades, particularly since the 1990s and the strengthening of Israel-Japan relations, the community has seen an increase in Israeli residents and the establishment of Chabad centers in both Tokyo and Kobe, offering additional resources and contributing to the diversity of Jewish religious expression in the country.

The Jewish Independent reported that as of 2023, there are about 20 active kibbutzim in Japan.

== Rabbis ==
=== Tokyo Jewish Community ===
- Rabbi Herman Dicker, 1955–1959, Orthodox
- Rabbi Joir Adler, c. 1963–1966, Orthodox.
- Rabbi Marvin Tokayer, 1968–1976, Orthodox
- Rabbi Jonathan Z. Maltzman, 1980–1983, Conservative
- Rabbi Michael Schudrich, 1983–1989 Orthodox
- Rabbi Moshe Silberschein, 1989–1992, Conservative
- Rabbi Jim Lebeau, 1993–1997, Conservative
  - Jim Lebeau is the brother of Rabbi William Lebeau, former Dean of the Rabbinical School at the Jewish Theological Seminary of America.
- Rabbi Carnie Shalom Rose, 1998–1999, Conservative
- Rabbi Elliot Marmon, 1999–2002, Conservative
- Rabbi Henri Noach, 2002–2008, Conservative
- Rabbi Rachel Smookler, Reform, interim-rabbi
- Rabbi Antonio Di Gesù, 2009–2013, Conservative
- Rabbi David Kunin, 2013–2022, Conservative
- Rabbi Andrew Scheer, 2022–Present, Orthodox

=== Chabad ===
- Rabbi Mendi Sudakevich
- Rabbi Yehezkel Binyomin Edery

=== Jewish Community of Kobe ===
- Rabbi Gaoni Maatuf, 1998–2002
- Rabbi Asaf Tobi, 2002–2006
- Rabbi Yerachmiel Strausberg, 2006–2008
- Hagay Blumenthal, 2008–2009, lay leader
- Daniel Moskovich, 2009–2010, lay leader
- Rabbi David Gingold, 2010–2013
- Rabbi Shmuel Vishedsky, 2014–present

=== Jewish Community of Okinawa ===
- Rabbi Yonatan Warren, 2011–2014
- Rabbi Yonina Creditor, 2013–2016
- Rabbi David Bauman, 2016–2017
- Rabbi Yonatan Greenberg, 2018–present
- Rabbi Levy Pekar, 2019–present

== List of notable Jews in Japan ==
- Abraham Kaufman
- Alan Terence Kawarai Lefor, MD MPH PhD DrEng FACS, Professor of Surgery, professor emeritus of Jichi Medical University
- Alan Merrill
- Albert Mosse
- Alfred Birnbaum
- Arie Selinger
- Ayako Fujitani, writer and actress
- Avi Schafer
- Barak Kushner
- Beate Sirota Gordon, former Performing Arts Director of Japan Society and Asia Society
- Ben-Ami Shillony, Israeli Japanologist
- Chaim Janowski
- Charles Louis Kades
- Dan Calichman
- David G. Goodman, Japanologist
- Emil Orlík
- Emmanuel Metter
- Fumiko Kometani, author and artist
- Heinrich Bürger
- Henryk Lipszyc
- Hoshitango Imachi, né Imachi Marcelo Salomon
- Jack Halpern, Israeli linguist, Kanji-scholar
- Janos Cegledy, pianist, composer and Holocaust lecturer
- Jay Rubin
- John Nathan
- Joseph Rosenstock, conductor of the NHK Symphony Orchestra
- Julie Dreyfus
- Karl Taro Greenfeld, journalist and author
- Klaus Pringsheim Sr.
- Kurt Singer
- Leonid Kreutzer, pianist
- Leo Sirota
- Ludwig Riess
- Manfred Gurlitt
- Martin "Marty" Adam Friedman, rock guitarist
- Max Janowski
- Michael Kogan, founder of Taito
- Ofer Feldman, University professor
- Peter Berton, Japanologist
- Péter Frankl, Hungarian mathematician
- Rachel Elior
- Raphael Schoyer
- Rena "Rusty" Kanokogi, née Glickman
- Roger Pulvers
- Setsuzo (Avraham) Kotsuji, Hebrew professor
- Shaul Eisenberg, businessman
- Shifra Horn
- Suiren Higashino, female photographer, model
- Sulamith Messerer
- Szymon Goldberg
- Yaacov Liberman
- Yakov Zinberg, Prof., Kokushikan University
- Zerach Warhaftig
- Kanji (Yitzhak) Ishizumi (Japanese: 石角完爾)
- Sally Weil
- Tsvi Sadan, Israeli Esperantist
- Hideo Levy
- Peter Barakan
- Steven Seagal

=== People of Jewish descent ===
- Bernard Jean Bettelheim (Christian)
- Luís de Almeida (New Christian)
- Martin Kafka

=== Refugees, short expatriates ===
- Adolf (Aron) Moses Pollak (Ritter) von Rudin
- Albert Kahn (banker)
- Emil Lederer
- Franz Oppenheimer
- George W. F. Hallgarten
- Hayyim Selig Slonimski
- Karl Kindermann, interpreter and informant for the Gestapo
- Karl Löwith
- Leo Melamed
- Mirra Alfassa
- Moshe Atzmon
- Norman Mailer
- Robert Alan Feldman
- Samuel Isaac Joseph Schereschewsky (Christian)

=== Other related people to Judaism and Jews in Japan ===
- Hana Brady, and George Brady
- Jeremy Glick
- Lili Kraus
- Samuel Ullman
- Kazuo Ueda, Japan's leading Yiddishist

=== Ambassadors ===
- Eli Cohen
- Rahm Emanuel
- Ruth Kahanoff (Kahanov)

== Films ==
- Jewish Soul Music: The Art of Giora Feidman (1980). Directed by Uri Barbash.

== See also ==
- Antisemitism in Japan
- Chiune Sugihara – Japanese diplomat responsible for saving around five thousand Jewish refugees in World War 2.
- Israel–Japan relations
- Japanese–Jewish common ancestry theory
- Jewish settlement in the Japanese Empire
- Racism in Japan
- Racial Equality Proposal – Japanese proposed amendment to the treaty of Versailles.
- Religion in Japan
- Timeline of Jewish history
