= Janowski =

Janowski (feminine: Janowska; plural: Janowscy) is a Polish surname. It is related to a number of surnames in other languages.

== Related surnames ==
Language	Masculine	Feminine
Polish	Janowski	Janowska
Belarusian (Romanization)	Яноўскі (Yanouski, Janoŭski, Yanowski)	Яноўская (Yanouskaya, Janoŭskaja, Yanowskaya)
Bulgarian (Romanization)	Яновски (Yanovski, Janovski)	Яновска (Yanovska, Janovska)
Czech/Slovak	Janovský	Janovská
Hungarian	Janovszky, Janovszki, Janowszky	
Latvian	Janovskis	
Lithuanian	Janauskas	Janauskienė (married); Janauskaitė (unmarried)
Macedonian	Јановски (Janovski)	Јановска (Janovska)
Romanian/Moldovan	Ianovschi, Ianovschii	
Russian (Romanization)	Яновский (Yanovskiy, Yanovsky, Ianovskii, Ianovski, Janovskij)	Яновская (Yanovskaya, Yanovskaia, Ianovskaia, Janovskaja)
Ukrainian (Romanization)	Яновський (Yanovskyi, Yanovskyy, Yanovsky; Ianovskyi, Janovskyj)	Яновська (Yanovska, Ianovska, Janovska)
Other	Janowsky, Janofsky, Yanowsky, Yanovski, Yanofski, Yanofsky	

== People ==
=== Janowski/Janowska ===
- Adam Janowski (born 1987), English rugby league player
- Alina Janowska (1923–2017), Polish actress
- Bronisława Janowska (1868–1953), Polish painter and publisher
- Chaim Janowski (1867–1935), Polish-Jewish chess master, brother of Dawid
- Claire Janowski, American politician
- Dawid Janowski (1868–1927), Polish chess master, brother of Chaim
- Gabriel Janowski (born 1947), Polish politician
- Janusz Janowski (born 1965), Polish artist and musician
- Jarosław Janowski (born 1967), Polish rower
- Maciej Janowski (born 1991), Polish speedway rider
- Marek Janowski (born 1939), Polish-born conductor
- Max Janowski (1912–1991), Polish composer of Jewish liturgical music
- Mieczysław Janowski (born 1947), Polish politician
- Piotr Janowski (1951–2008), Polish violinist
- Sylwester Janowski (born 1976), Polish footballer
- Werner von Janowski (c.1903–1978), German Nazi spy
- Wioletta Janowska (born 1977), Polish runner
- Wojciech Janowski (born 1949), Polish-Monegasque businessman and diplomat

=== Yanovsky/Yanovskaya/etc. ===
- Aleksandr Yanovsky (born 1952), Russian footballer
- Anna Yanovskaya (born 1996), Russian ice dancer
- Avrom Yanovsky (1911–1979), Canadian editorial cartoonist
- Borys Yanovsky (1875–1933), Russian/Ukrainian composer
- Chana Schneerson (née Yanovsky; 1880–1964), wife of Levi Yitzchak Schneerson and mother of Menachem Mendel Schneerson
- Igor Yanovsky (born 1974), Russian footballer
- Nikki Yanofsky (born 1994), Canadian musician
- Rudolph Yanovskiy (1929–2010), Russian philosopher
- Saul Yanovsky (1864–1939), American anarchist
- Semyon Yanovsky (1788–1876), Russian naval officer
- Sofya Yanovskaya (1896–1966), Soviet mathematician and historian
- Vasyl Gogol-Yanovsky (1777–1825), Ukrainian playwright and poet, father of Nikolai Gogol
- Vyacheslav Yanovskiy (born 1957), Belarusian boxer
- Zal Yanovsky (1944–2002), Canadian rock musician

== See also ==
- Yanofsky, alternate romanization.
- Janowski Don Kichot, a Polish ultralight aircraft
- Jankowski
