= Gustav Kral =

Austrian footballer

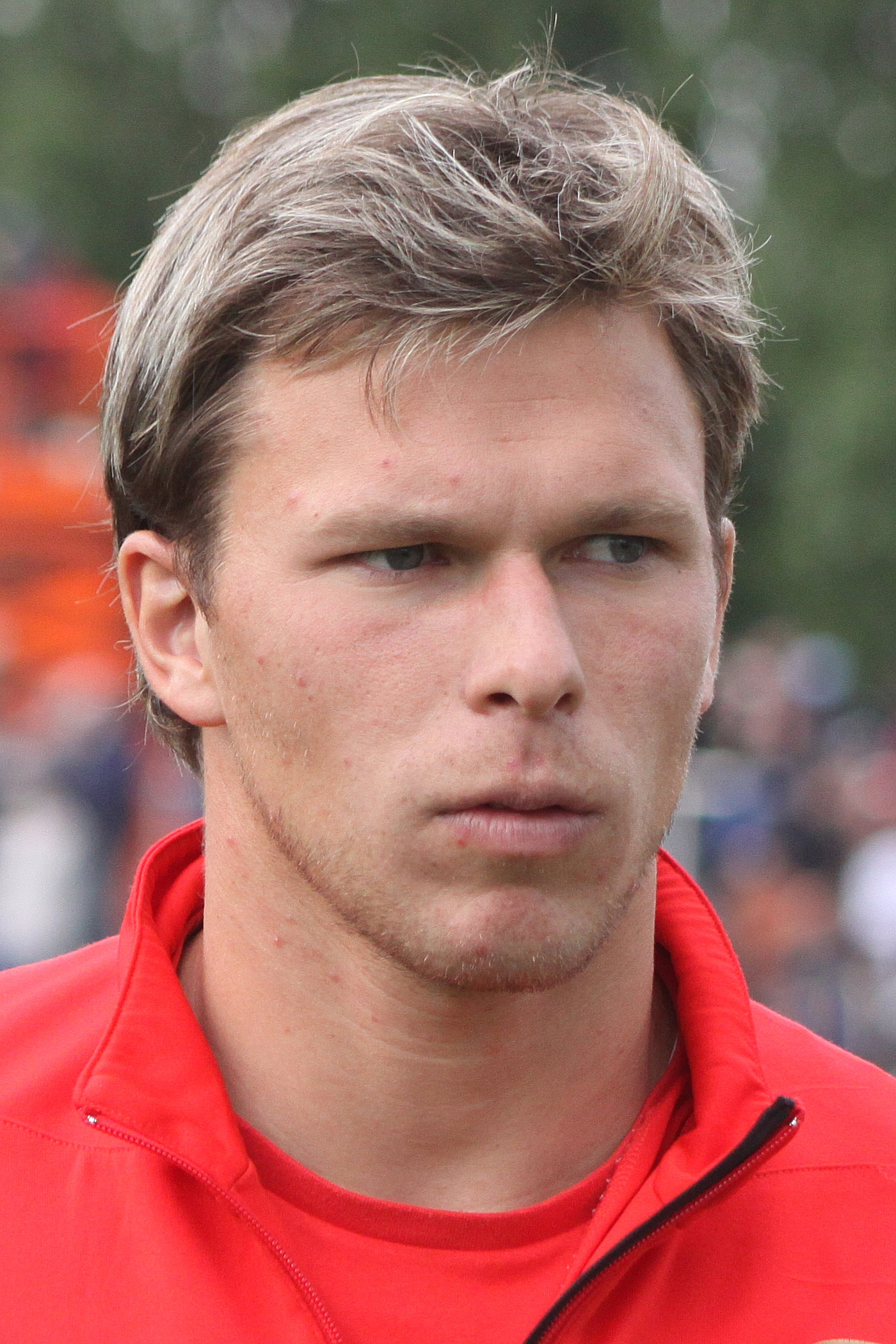

Personal information
- Date of birth: 4 June 1983
- Place of birth: Vienna, Austria
- Date of death: 11 October 2009 (aged 26)
- Place of death: Lichtenwörth, Austria
- Height: 1.91 m (6 ft 3 in)
- Position: Goalkeeper

Youth career
- 1999–2000: ASV Vösendorf
- 1999–2000: SV Neuberg

Senior career*
Years	Team	Apps	(Gls)
2000–2001	Admira Wacker		
2001–2002	FK Austria Wien II		
2002–2003	SV Neuberg	7	(0)
2003–2004	Wacker Mödling II		
2004–2005	Admira Wacker	1	(0)
2005–2007	DSV Leoben	16	(0)
2007	Admira Wacker	8	(0)
2008	SK Schwadorf	0	(0)
2008–2009	Trenkwalder Admira	3	(0)
2009	UFC Purbach	10	(0)
Total		60	(0)

International career
2000–2001	Austria U-18	2	(0)
2003	Austria U-21	1	(0)
- * Club domestic league appearances and goals

Gustav Kral (4 June 1983 - 11 October 2009) was an Austrian football player.

== Career ==
Kral played in his career for Admira Wacker, Austria Wien, DSV Leoben, SK Schwadorf, Trenkwalder Admira, SV Neuberg and last for UFC Purbach.

== Death ==
Kral died on 11 October 2009 near Lichtenwörth in a car accident; his girlfriend, model Patricia Kaiser, survived the accident.
