= Avivi =

Avivi is a Jewish given name or surname. It may refer to:

- Avivi Zohar (born 1972), Israeli footballer
- Eli Avivi, founder of Akhzivland, a micronation between Nahariya, Israel and the Lebanese border on the Israeli west coast
- Gidi Avivi (born 1961), Israeli film producer, the founder of Vice Versa Films

== See also ==
- Aviv
- Avivim, a moshav in the far north of Israel, in the Upper Galilee
