= Shoista Mullojonova =

Tajik-Bukharian singer (1925–2010)

Shoista Mullodzhanova Шоиста Муллоҷонова
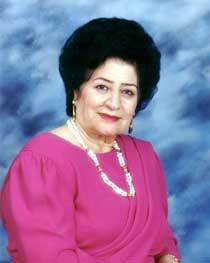
- Mullojonova in 1988

Background information
- Born: Shushana Rubinovna Mullodzhanova; September 3, 1925
- Origin: Dushanbe, Tajik ASSR, USSR
- Died: June 26, 2010 (aged 84) New York City, U.S.
- Genres: Shashmaqom, Middle Eastern music
- Occupations: Singer; Musician
- Instruments: Vocals, daf
- Years active: 1941–2010

Shoista Mullojonova (Tajik: Шоиста Муллоҷонова), born Shushana Rubinovna Mullodzhanova (Russian: Шоиста Рубиновна Муллоджанова), was a renowned Bukharian Jewish Shashmaqam singer.

== Early life ==
She was born in Dushanbe, Tajik ASSR to a religious Bukharian Jewish family. Her mother, Sivyo Davydova, was from Samarkand and her father, Rubin Mullodzhanov, originally came from Bukhara. Her family traces its ancestry to an artistocratic Levite tribe that has been into performing and entertaining since the time of the First and Second Temple in Jerusalem.

Her family was full of entertainers (actors, singers, and musicians). In 1924, her parents and older siblings (Ribi, Levi, Ishokhor, Zulai, Naftoli) moved from Uzbekistan to Tajikistan, where Shoista was born a year later. She spoke both Bukhori and Russian. Her mother was also a singer and her whole family was into music and acting. She graduated from the Stalinabad Women's Pedagogical School in 1943 and studied at the Moscow Conservatory from 1947 to 1953.

== Career ==
Shoista Mullojonova had her debut at age 8 when she sang on Dushanbe radio. During the beginning of her career, in the early 1940s, she was part of the Rubab Player Ensemble in Tajikistan's Ensemble. With the ensemble, in 1945, she sang in Iran for the royal family of Iran and the Shah, the Pahlavis including Reza Shah, and for the Iranian audience in Bukhori. She earned the title, Merited Artist of Tajikistan, at the age of 20.

By the mid-1940s, Mullojonova broke away from the ensemble and began to sing solo. In May 1945, at the conclusion of the Great Patriotic War, she sang the Tajik/Russian song "Idi Zafar" (Holiday of Victory) on the Tajik State Radio in Stalinabad in honor of Victory Day over Nazi Germany. After graduating from the Moscow Conservatory in 1953, she performed at the Aini Theater for Opera and Ballet. The roles that she developed there include Mahin in Tohir va Zuhro (Tohir and Zuhro) by A. Lenskii; Gulizor in Shurishi Vose (The Vose Uprising) by S. Balasanian; Marfa in Arusi Shoh (The Bride of the King) by Rimsky-Korsakov, and others.

Through the years, she sang Shashmaqam music throughout Central Asia, Middle East, and the Soviet Union and made a wonderful living. She was named the "People's Artist of the Tajik SSR", in 1957 and Merited Artist of the USSR. From the mid-1950s to the mid-1970s, she was a soloist vocalist for the Tajik State Philharmonic. Mullojonova sang music of all other Soviet republics and of Eastern people. She always preferred the music of her Eastern and Tajik people. In 1975, she was named senior instructor at the Tajikistan State Institute of Arts. In the 1980s, Mullojonova earned a reputation for being the Queen of Tajik Music. She sang in Central Asia and all over the former Soviet Union for 50 years.

== Personal life and later career ==
Shoista Mullojonova was married to Efrem Haritonovich Benyaev from 1946 until his death in 1999. They had three children: Anna (a businesswoman living in Forest Hills, Queens, New York), Negmat (PhD, based in Moscow), and Sofia (M.D., based in Austria).

In 1991, Shoista and her family began to move from Central Asia, to the United States because of the dissolution of the Soviet Union and the start of the civil war and rise of Islamic fundamentalism in Tajikistan. The family settled in Forest Hills, New York. After emigrating to New York, Shoista joined the Bukharan Shashmaqam Ensemble, founded by Fatima Kuinova, "Merited Artist Tajikistan", and later the "Maqom" Ensemble, founded by Ilyas Malayev, "Merited Artist of Uzbekistan". After her husband, Efrem Haritonovitch Benyaev, died, she dedicated an album, "I'm Singing for You", in his memory. In September 2005, in Forest Hills High School, Shoista sang for an audience who all came to celebrate her 80th birthday, including then-New York City Mayor Michael Bloomberg, former Governor George Pataki, President Emomali Rahmon of Tajikistan, and Boris Kandov, President of the Bukharian Jewish Congress of USA and Canada. Aged 80 she was able to touch people with her singing and remind them that she is singing for each and every one of them, as she says, "I am singing for you."

Boris Kandov published a biography about Shoista Mullojonova, entitled "Born to Sing", written by musicologist and author Rafael Nektalov, as well as making a documentary about the legendary singer. In March 2008, Shoista performed at the Golden Ilyas Awards Ceremony singing "Ey Dukhtari Nozanini Qadras" (Persian for "Hey, Beautiful Girl, All Grown Up) and received an award. The concert was held in honor of Bukharian poet, musician, and playwright, Ilyas Malayev.

In May 2010, a month before her death, she sang at the Russian Consulate General of New York the classic Russian/Tajik song, "Holiday of Victory" (Idi Zafar/Prazdnik Pobedy) in honor of the 65th anniversary of Victory over Nazism and was awarded the Russian medal in honor of being a participant in the war against Nazi Germany during the Great Patriotic War. This being her most famous song, which she sang 65 years earlier on the Tajik state radio on May 9, 1945, on the news of the Soviet Victory over Nazi Germany.

== Death ==
On June 26, 2010, Shoista Mullojonova died after suffering a heart attack in Forest Hills, New York, three months before her 85th birthday. In accordance with Jewish law, which requires the burial of a deceased person immediately after their death, Mullojonova was buried the day after her death in the Bukharian Jewish section of Wellwood Cemetery in Long Island, New York next to her husband and deceased family members. Soon after, the people of Tajikistan heard this and, the following day, President Emomalii Rahmon sent a message to the United States expressing his condolence to the relatives of this legendary singer, and Tajik embassies around the world held events in her honor.

== Other ==
Her nephew, Yudik Mullodzhanov, was a singer, and her niece, Rosa Mullodzhanova, is known as an "Honored Artist of Tajikistan".

== Awards and honors ==
- Medal "For Labour Valour" (1954)
- People's Artist of the Tajik SSR (1957)
- Order of the Red Banner of Labour (1957)
- Order of Lenin
- Order of the Badge of Honour
