= Shigaku zasshi =

Shigaku zasshi 史学雑誌
- Language: English

Standard abbreviations
- ISO 4: Shigaku zasshi

Indexing
- ISSN: 0018-2478 (print); 2424-2616 (web)

Links
- Journal homepage; [www.jstage.jst.go.jp/browse/shigaku/list/-char/ja browse in Japanese]

Shigaku zasshi (史学雑誌, literally, Journal of Historical Science) is the oldest academic journal of history in Japan. It was established in 1889 as the official publication of the Historical Society of Japan (shigakkai) in Tokyo. It is published in Japanese with English abstracts.

== History of Shigaku zasshi and the Historical Society ==
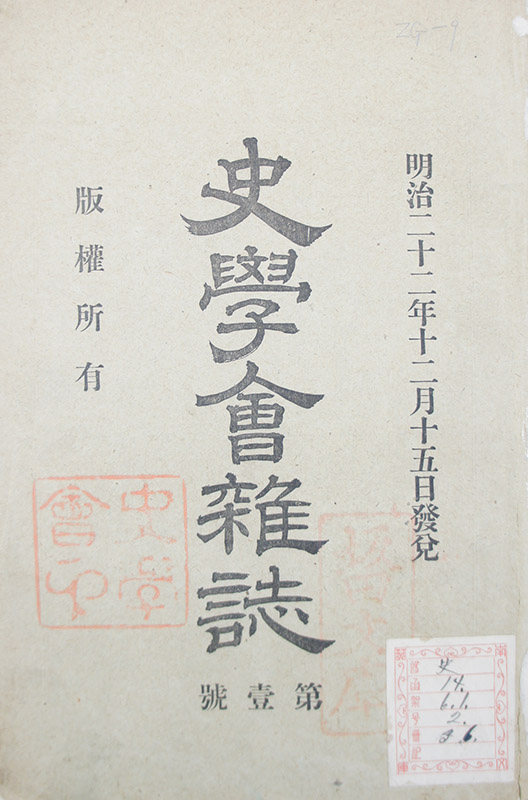
First edition of the Shigakkai zasshi.

The Historical Society of Japan was founded on November 1, 1889, and began publishing a historical journal entitled Shigakkai zasshi (Journal of the Historical Society) on December 15 of that same year. In 1892 the name of the journal was changed to Shigaku zasshi. Two professors of history at Tokyo Imperial University, Shigeno Yasutsugu and Ludwig Rieß were instrumental in founding the society and beginning publication of the journal. Ludwig Rieß consciously modeled the journal on contemporary European historical journals such as the Historische Zeitschrift in Germany, the Revue Historique in France, and the English Historical Review in England.

Shigeno Yasutsugu was also the only president of the Historical Society of Japan. He was president of the society from its founding in 1889 until his death in 1910. No successor has ever been appointed.

== Contents ==
The journal consists of original research articles, reviews, and reports on academic trends in various fields. Although articles on Japanese and East Asian history are particularly well represented within the pages of this journal, articles on European and American history also have a visible presence. Articles devoted to topics outside of East Asia, Europe, and the US are relatively uncommon.

== May issue ==
The annual May issue of Shigaku zasshi is of particular interest to historians trying to keep up with recent historiographic developments in Japan. The May issue is devoted to review articles summing up recent developments in the academic field of history within Japan. A general assessment of the work of the previous year in the field of history is summed up in the recurring section "Kaiko to tenbō" (“review and outlook”), and articles devoted to more specialized areas follow.

Articles in the May issue are divided by (1) region (2) period and (3) thematic subject (such as "intellectual history" or "economic history"). While the sections for region and period are relatively stable, the sections for thematic subject often change from year to year.

As an example of the geographic and chronological distribution of articles, the 2005 May issue contained 1 article on historiographic theory, 5 articles on Japan (divided by period), 9 articles on China (thinly divided by period), 1 article on Korea, 1 article on Central Asia, 1 article on Southeast Asia, 1 article on South Asia, 1 article on West Asia/North Africa, 1 article on Africa, 17 articles on Europe (divided by both period and country), and 2 articles on America (divided into North America and Latin America).

May issues of Shigaku zasshi from 1949–1985 are also collected in the volume, Nihon rekishi gakkai no kaiko to tenbō edited by the Historical Society of Japan and published in 1987 by Yamakawa Shuppansha.
