= Foreign-born Japanese =

A foreign-born Japanese is a Japanese person of foreign descent or heritage, who was born outside Japan and later acquired Japanese citizenship. This category encompasses persons of both Japanese and non-Japanese descent. The former subcategory is considered because of intricacies of national and international laws regarding the citizenship of newborn persons.

Dual nationality is not recognized in Japan. Under Japanese nationality law, people who acquire dual nationality before the age of 20 must choose a single nationality before reaching age 22, and people who acquire dual nationality after the age of 20 must choose a single nationality within 2 years.

== Japanese by naturalization ==
- Akebono Taro (b. Chad Rowan), sumo wrestler
- Bobby Ologun, TV talent
- Chen Kenmin, TV chef
- Sergio Ariel Escudero, football player
- Ofer Feldman, scholar of Japanese political psychology
- Tomokazu Harimoto, table-tennis player
- Dido Havenaar, football player
- Mike Havenaar, football player
- Hoshitango Imachi, sumo wrestler
- Koizumi Yakumo (b. Lafcadio Hearn), Meiji-era author
- Konishiki Yasokichi (b. Saleva'a Fuauli Atisano'e), sumo wrestler
- Kotoōshū Katsunori (b. Kaloyan Mahlyanov), sumo wrestler
- Wagner Lopes (b. Wagner Augusto Lopes), football player
- Sachi Minowa (b. Alyja Daphne Santiago), volleyball player
- Miura Anjin (b. William Adams), Edo-era mariner
- Erikson Noguchipinto, football player
- Debito Arudou (b. David Schofill ne Aldwinckle), blogger
- Ruy Ramos (b. Ruy Gonçalves Ramos Sobrinho), soccer player
- Rikidōzan (b. Kim Sin-Nak), wrestler
- Kenny Omega, professional wrestler
- J. R. Sakuragi (b. Milton "J.R." Henderson), basketball player
- Ademir Santos, football player
- Alessandro Santos (b. Alessandro dos Santos), football player
- Marcos Sugiyama, volleyball player
- Takamiyama Daigoro, (b. Jesse James Wailani Kuhaulua), sumo wrestler
- Marutei Tsurunen (b. Martti Turunen), politician
- Batara Eto, co-founder of mixi
- Donald Keene (also known as Donarudo Kiin), scholar and translator of Japanese literature and culture

== Japanese born abroad ==
- Takeshi Kaneshiro, actor
- Hikaru Utada, singer
- Luiz Gushiken
- Mina, singer in South Korean group Twice
- Daisuke Ishiwatari, game designer
- Children of the Japanese abducted to North Korea during the 1970s–80s. Although the children had Korean names at birth, they were registered as Japanese and given Japanese names when they arrived in Japan along with their returning parents.

== See also ==
- Ethnic issues in Japan
- Gaijin
- Dekasegi
