= Iraj Lalezari =

Iranian scientist (1930–2019)

- Born: 4 July 1930; Hamadan, Qajar Iran
- Died: 31 July 2019 (aged 89); Boulder, Colorado, US
- Resting place: Green Mountain Cemetery, Boulder, CO, US
- Education: Organic chemistry; Pharmacology
- Alma mater: University of Tehran; University of Sorbonne
- Children: 2
- Awards: Lavoisier Medal
- Scientific career
- Fields: Organic chemistry; Pharmacology
- Institutions: University of Tehran; Montefiore Medical Center; Albert Einstein College of Medicine

Iraj Lalezari (1930–2019) was an Iranian academic. His study fields were organic chemistry and pharmacology. He left Iran in 1979 following the regime change in the country and settled in the US where he continued his academic studies.

== Early life and education ==
Lalezari was born in Hamadan on 4 July 1930. He was the eldest of four siblings. He received a degree in pharmacology from the University of Tehran. He obtained his PhD in pharmacology from his alma mater in 1951. He also received a PhD in organic chemistry from the University of Sorbonne in 1953. He carried out his post-doctorate studies in organic chemistry at the same institution in 1954.

== Career and activities ==
Following his graduation, Lalezari joined the University of Tehran where he served as the chair of the chemistry department (1970–1978) and the dean of the pharmacology faculty (1973–1979). In 1964 he was promoted to a professorship in organic chemistry. He was named as the chair of the Iranian Pharmaceutical Association in 1975 which he held until 1979. In 1976 he was made a member of the Iranian Royal Academy of Sciences. In 1977 he established the Institute at Medicinal Plants at the University of Tehran which he headed until 1979.

He had to leave Iran due to the establishment of an Islamic government in February 1979 and continued his academic studies in New York City where he worked at the Montefiore Medical Center and Albert Einstein College of Medicine. He served as the director of medicinal chemistry in the latter.

Lalezari was part of the Iranian Jewish delegation led by Moussa Kermanian who met with President Jimmy Carter in 1980. The goal of the meeting was to facilitate the migration of Iranian Jews to the US.

He was a member of the American Jewish Federation and the Maccabee Foundation based in New York. In 2006 Lalezari retired from academic life.

=== Patents and work ===
Lalezari had numerous patents which he obtained between February 1977 and May 2015, including treatments for Alzheimer's disease using gene therapy methodologies. Some of these patents were taken jointly by him and his brother Parviz.

Iraj Lalezari discovered the hemoglobin A1C test which has been used in many countries to diagnose diabetes. He also invented some compounds of fluoride and selenium.

== Later years, personal life and death ==
Lalezari was married and had two sons. Following his retirement he settled in Colorado and continued his studies at his home laboratory. In 2010 he joined Cell Viable, a company that develops and produces skincare products. He died in Boulder, Colorado, on 31 July 2019. He was buried at the Green Mountain Cemetery in Boulder on 2 August.

== Awards ==
Lalezari was the recipient of the Lavoisier Medal which was granted to him in 1954 by the French Chemical Society. He was also awarded by the Shah Mohammad Reza Pahlavi and Empress Farah Pahlavi for his outstanding studies.
