= Janos Cegledy =

Hungarian pianist, composer and Holocaust lecturer

- Janos Czeglédi
- Born: May 4, 1937 (age 89); Budapest, Hungary

Janos Czeglédi (also known as Janos Czegledi; born 4 May, 1937) He is a Japanese Hungarian pianist, music educator, composer, and lecturer on his experiences during the Holocaust.

== Biography ==
Cegledy, along with his brother, grandparents and aunt, were sent to the Budapest Ghetto in 1944. His mother was deported to Lichtenwörth concentration camp and his father to Mauthausen concentration camp. In 1948, Cegledy, his parents and brother, emigrated to New Zealand.

He graduated from Victoria University, and moved to Germany with a scholarship from the German Academic Exchange Service (DAAD) to study under Andor Földes at the Saarland State Conservatory for Music.

Cegledy moved to Japan in 1967. Since 2000, he has lectured internationally, and given piano recitals around the world. He has also judged numerous competitions both in Japan and abroad, and has written dozens of piano compositions.

He has served as a professor at the Toho College of Music and is on faculty of Musashino Academia Musicae. He is the president of the Leschetizky Society of Japan.

Since 2016, he has given talks throughout Japan about the Holocaust and his experiences.

== Personal life ==
Cegledy was married to Reiko Matsuzaki. After their divorce, he married Chiyoko in 1981, with whom he has one son.
