= Baba'i ben Lotf =

Iranian Jewish poet and historian (17th century)

Baba'i ben Lotf (Persian: بابائی بن لطف, Hebrew: באבאי בן לוטף; died after 1662) was a Jewish poet and historian in 17th-century Safavid Iran. He lived in Kashan, where he probably originally hailed from, and was the author of the first Judeo-Persian chronicle, the Ketāb-e anūsī, or the Book of the forced convert (see anusim). It consists of some 5,300 verses written in Persian using the Hebrew script, or Judeo-Persian. Ben Lotf was forcibly converted to Islam, but practiced Judaism in secret. It is considered one of the first historical narrative works of Iranian Jews. He is a member of the crypto-Jewish community of Iran. Baba'i ben Farhad (fl. 18th century) was one of his grandsons who followed in his footsteps as a chronicler.

== Sources ==
- Moreen, Vera B. (2010). "Bābāī ben Luṭf". In Norman A. Stillman (ed.). Encyclopedia of Jews in the Islamic World. Brill Online.
- Netzer, Amnon (1988). "BĀBĀʾĪ BEN FARHĀD". In Yarshater, Ehsan (ed.). Encyclopædia Iranica. Vol. III/3: Azerbaijan IV–Bačča(-ye) Saqqā. London and New York: Routledge & Kegan Paul. p. 297. ISBN 978-0-71009-115-4.
- Netzer, Amnon (1988). "BĀBĀʾĪ BEN LOṬF". In Yarshater, Ehsan (ed.). Encyclopædia Iranica. Vol. III/3: Azerbaijan IV–Bačča(-ye) Saqqā. London and New York: Routledge & Kegan Paul. pp. 297–298. ISBN 978-0-71009-115-4.
