= Lichtenwörth concentration camp =

Nazi concentration camp in Austria (1944–1945)

- Concentration camp
- Interactive map of Lichtenwörth concentration camp
- Coordinates: 47°49′N 16°16′E
- Location: Lichtenwörth, Lower Austria (then: Reichsgau Niederdonau), Austria
- Operational: December 10, 1944 – April 1945
- Number of inmates: Primarily Hungarian Jewish women
- Killed: Over 300 (malnutrition and typhus)
- Liberation date: April 2, 1945
- Liberated by: Soviet Army

Lichtenwörth concentration camp was a subcamp of Mauthausen concentration camp in the small town of Lichtenwörth approximately 30–40 km south of Vienna, near Wiener Neustadt. The camp held mainly Jewish women who were force-marched from Budapest. It was opened on December 10, 1944, and was liberated by the Soviet army on April 2, 1945.

== History ==
Lichtenwörth was one of over 100 subcamps (German: Außenlager) of Mauthausen, built to accommodate additional prisoners after the main camp was full.

The camp's inmates were drawn predominantly from the mass deportations of Hungarian Jews that followed the Arrow Cross seizure of power in Hungary in October 1944. On 8 November 1944, the Arrow Cross regime told more than 70,000 Jews to report to the Ujlaki brickyards in Óbuda, and from there forced them to march on foot to camps in Austria. Thousands were shot and thousands more died as a result of starvation or exposure to the bitter cold. Among the survivors of this and related deportation actions, a group of primarily Jewish women were directed to Lichtenwörth, where they arrived in November 1944.

The camp fell within the expanding network of Mauthausen women's subcamps formally established in September 1944. The total number of prisoners held at Lichtenwörth was about 2,500.

== Conditions ==
Prisoners were subjected to inadequate food rations, insufficient medical care, and harsh disciplinary measures. Sanitary infrastructure was severely inadequate, and prisoners made persistent efforts to keep themselves clean under deeply difficult circumstances.

== Liberation ==
In the final weeks of the war, prisoners became aware of the approach of Allied forces through the sound of distant gunfire. The German guards disappeared from the camp as Soviet forces drew near. The camp was liberated by the Soviet Army in March 1945.

== Aftermath and commemoration ==
The war memorial in Lichtenwörth, unveiled in 1992, commemorates the victims of both world wars as well as the typhus epidemic of 1945, the latter a direct consequence of the concentration camp having been sited in the town. The memorial is among the few public acknowledgements of the camp's existence in the locality.
