= Yanofsky =

Yanofsky is a surname. Notable people with the surname include:

- Charles Yanofsky (1925–2018), leading American geneticist
- Daniel Yanofsky, OC, QC (1925–2000), Canada's first chess grandmaster
- Joel Yanofsky, Canadian novelist and literary columnist
- Nikki Yanofsky (born 1994), Canadian jazz-pop singer-songwriter from Montreal, Quebec
- Saul Yanofsky or Saul Yanovsky (1864–1939), American Jewish anarchist and activist
- Zal Yanofsky or Zal Yanovsky (1944–2002), Canadian rock musician
