= Fatima Kuinova =

Tajik-American singer (1926–2021)

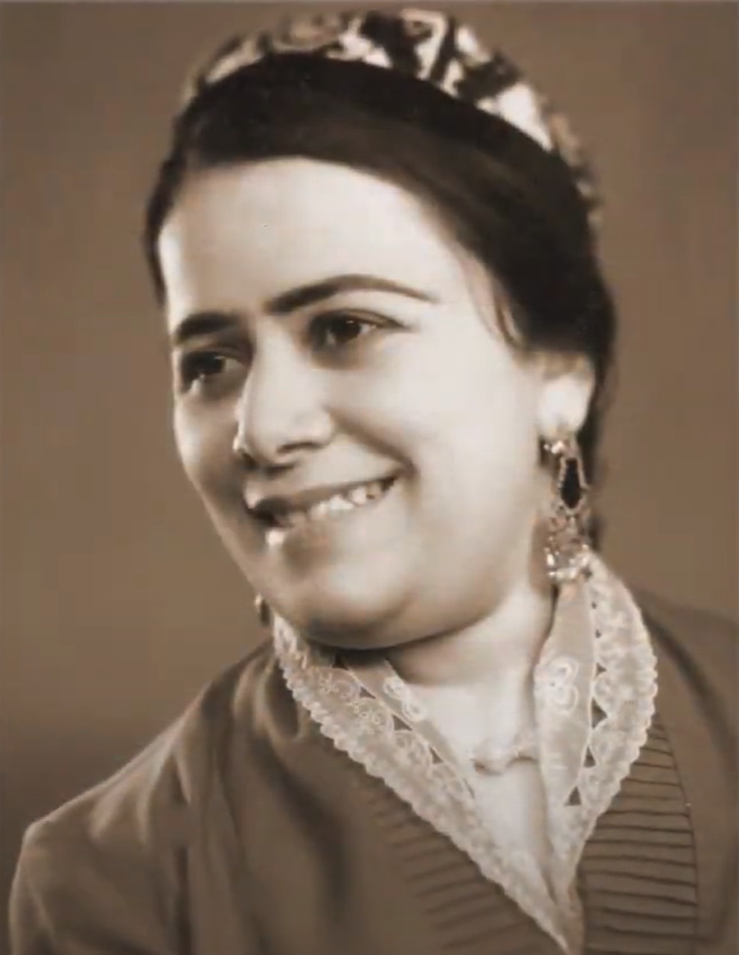
- Kuinova in 1948

Background information
- Born: Panir Ibragimova; 28 December 1926; Samarkand, Uzbek SSR
- Died: 28 December 2021 (aged 95) Queens, New York, U.S.
- Genre: Shashmakom
- Occupation: Singer

Panir Ibragimova (28 December 1926 – 28 December 2021), better known by the stage name Fatima Kuinova (Tajik: Фатима Куэнова, Russian: Фатима Куэнова), was a Bukharian Jewish Shashmakom singer. She was named "Merited Artist of the Soviet Union".

== Biography ==
Kuinova was born in Samarqand, Uzbek SSR on 28 December 1926. She moved to Stalinabad, Tajik SSR with her seven brothers and two sisters when she was thirteen years old, after their father was jailed and murdered by the Soviet government for his mercantile prosperity. Her family's last name was originally Cohen, but she changed it to Kuinova to escape the persecution Jews faced under Stalin. During her childhood, she knew the famous Mullojonov family and was a friend to Shoista Mullojonova. Her father was the cantor of a synagogue in her hometown and taught his daughter the music of her Bukharian Jewish heritage.

== Life and career ==
Kuinova began singing in different festivals at a young age. She also sang for Joseph Stalin, who was likely unaware of her Jewish faith and ethnicity.

Kuinova became famous after performing for the soldiers during World War II. In 1948, she was named "Honored Artist of the Soviet Union". After that, she began to study Shashmakom music and sang it throughout the Soviet Union and Central Asia. Kuinova became the lead singer of the Tajik State Philharmonic, with long-time friend Shoista Mullojonova. The two were widely recognized in the republic and were some of the Soviet Union's leading traditional performers. Both Kuinova and Mullojonova were soloists in the Tajik Ensemble "Rubobistok" that performed on television and radio throughout the Tajik SSR, Central Asia and the USSR and traveled to sing in areas like Kiev, Leningrad, and Moscow. She also went on tours to Europe, Afghanistan, and Iran, where she sang for the Shah.

She immigrated to Queens, New York, U.S. in 1980, and settled in Rego Park, where she founded and was the lead vocalist for the Shashmaqam Music of the Bukharan Jews Ensemble. In 1992, Kuinova was a recipient of the National Heritage Fellowship award, given by the National Endowment for the Arts. In Queens, Kuinova worked with the Bukharian Jewish musical community and performed in numerous cultural and folk events in New York City.

Kuinova died in Queens on 28 December 2021, her 95th birthday.
