= Boris Kandov =

Jewish activist

Boris Kandov is the President of the Bukharian Jewish Congress in the United States and Canada.

Kandov, who emigrated from Uzbekistan to the United States in 1987, operates a limousine fleet along with other family-owned businesses.

In 2016, Kandov served as an international observer during the presidential election in Uzbekistan.
