= Lichtenwörth =

Lichtenwörth Lichtnwiad
- Municipality
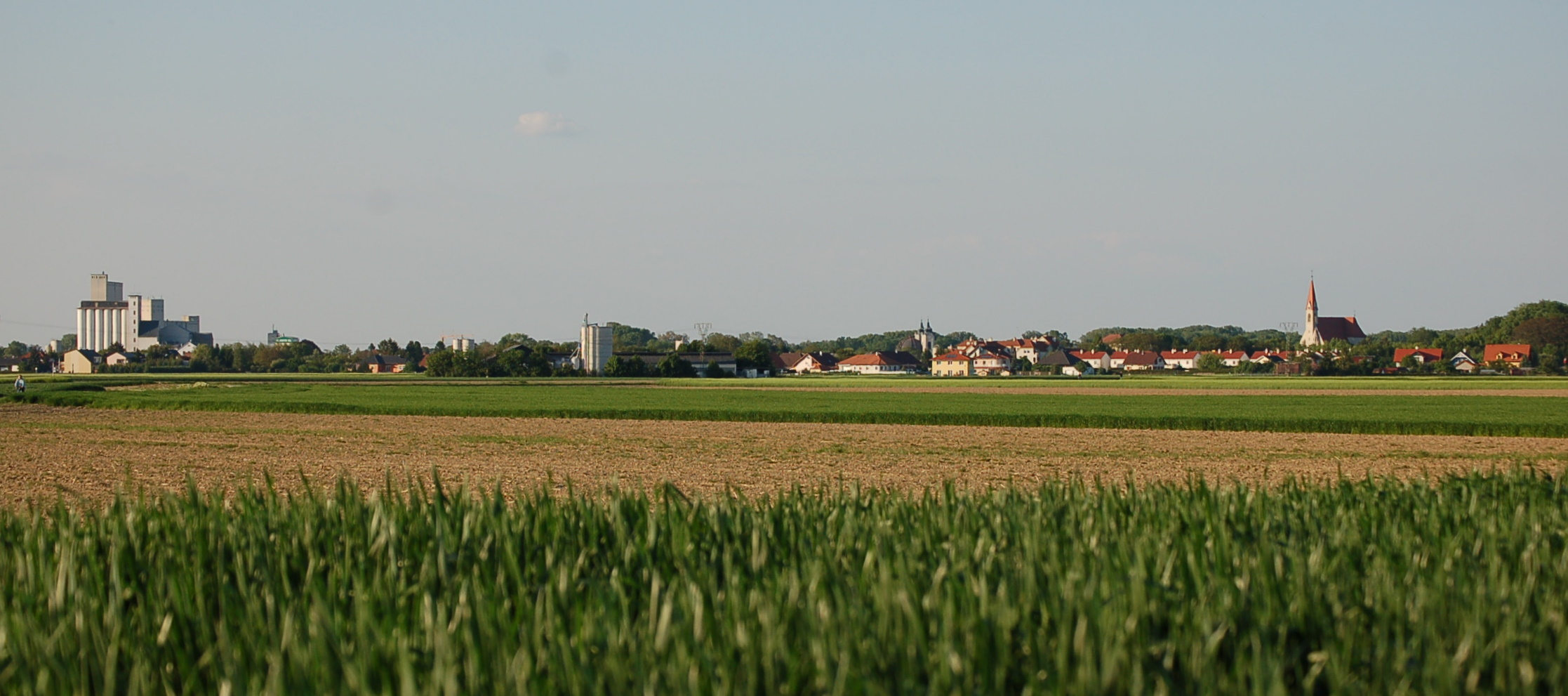
- Panorama of Lichtenwörth

- Coat of arms

- Location within Austria Lichtenwörth (Austria)
- Coordinates: 47°49′00″N 16°16′00″E
- Country: Austria
- State: Lower Austria
- District: Wiener Neustadt-Land

Government
  - Mayor: Manuel Zusag (WIR)

Area
  - Total: 22.91 km^{2} (8.85 sq mi)
- Elevation: 254 m (833 ft)

Population (2018-01-01)
  - Total: 2,727
  - Density: 119.0/km^{2} (308.3/sq mi)
- Time zone: UTC+1 (CET)
  - Summer (DST): UTC+2 (CEST)
- Postal code: 2493
- Area code: 02622
- Vehicle registration: WB
- Website: www.lichtenwoerth.at or www.nadelburg.at

Lichtenwörth (Central Bavarian: Lichtnwiad) is a market town in Austria. It is situated by the rivers Leitha and Warme Fischa. The market town has a kindergarten school, an elementary school and a high school. It also has a music school.

== History ==
The place was first mentioned in 1174. Also in the 12th century, a water castle was built, which was destroyed at the end of the 15th century.

In 1747, under the regency of Maria Theresa, the needle factory Nadelburg was established. The factory was expanded with a cotton mill in the early 19th century. A workers' settlement grew around the factories. The Nadelburg was closed in 1930. It is now a museum.

Lichtenwörth became a market town in 1992.

Lichtenworth is also remembered for its concentration slave labor camp during the Third Reich. It was a sub-camp of Mauthausen. Mainly Jewish women were force marched from Budapest. The conditions were brutal, over 300 people died of malnutrition and typhus.

== Notable People from Lichtenwörth ==
- Dominic Thiem: Professional tennis player who won the 2020 US Open title, and reached three other Grand Slam finals. He held a career-high ranking of No. 3 in March 2020.

== Politics ==
The council of Lichtenwörth consists of 21 members, grouped in 4 parties (2020 elections).

- SPÖ: 10 members
- WIR (Wir alle sind Lichtenwörth – i. e.: All of Us Are Lichtenwörth): 9 members
- FPÖ: 1 member
- ZL (Zukunft Lichtenwörth – i. e.: Future Lichtenwörth): 1 member

== Gallery ==
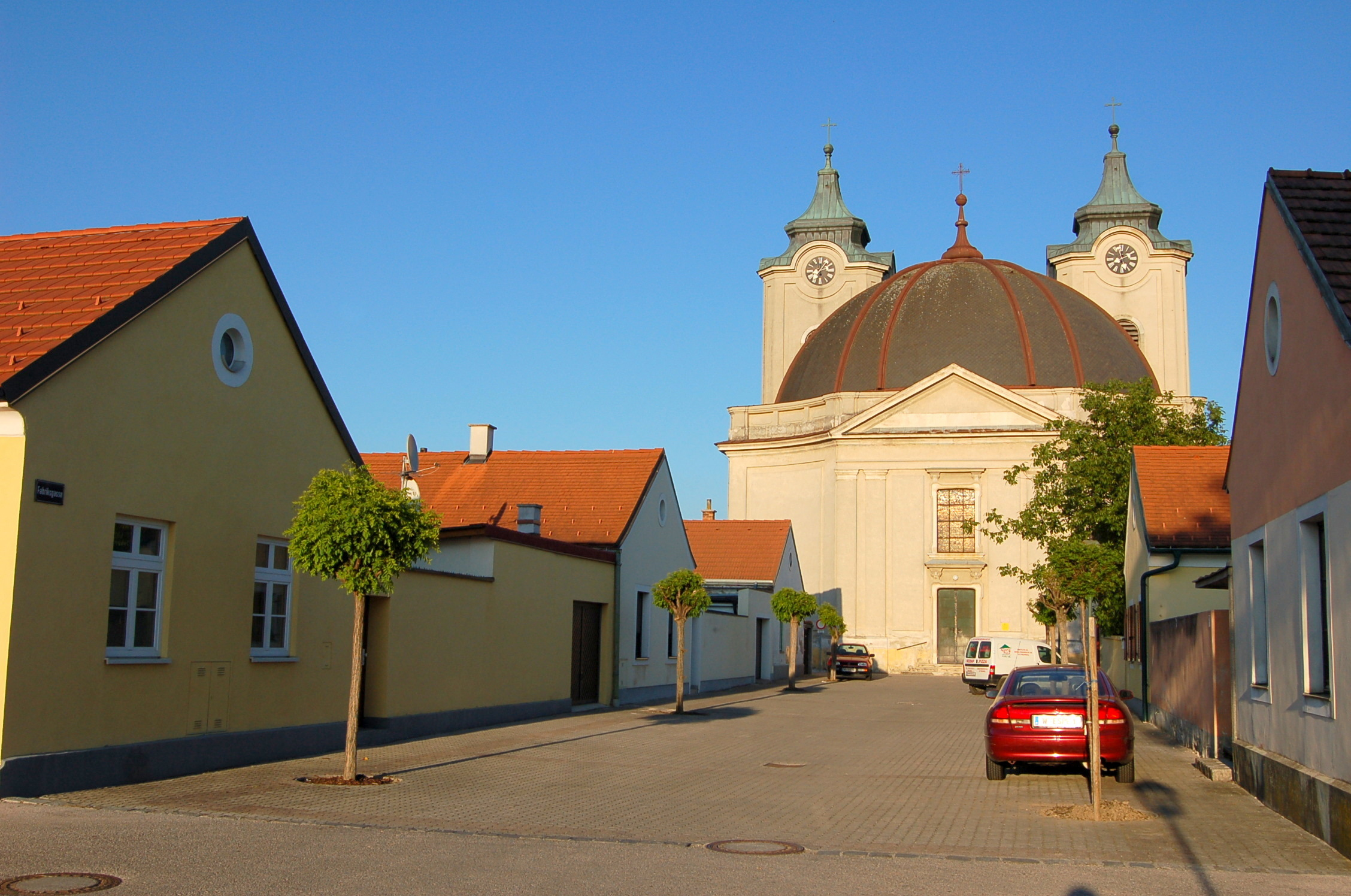
Nadelburg quarters and St. Theresa church

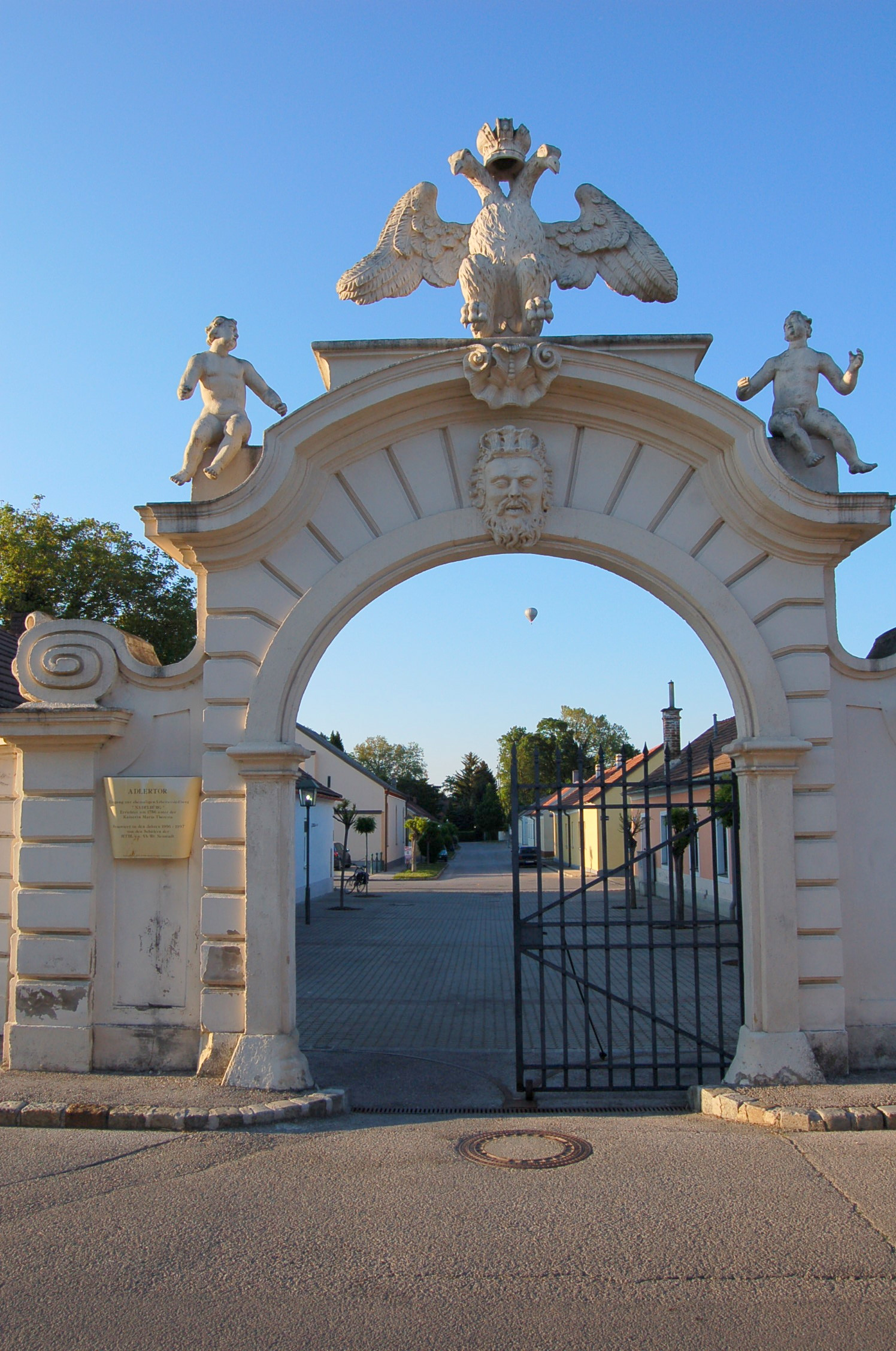
Adlertor, one of the entrances to the Nadelburg

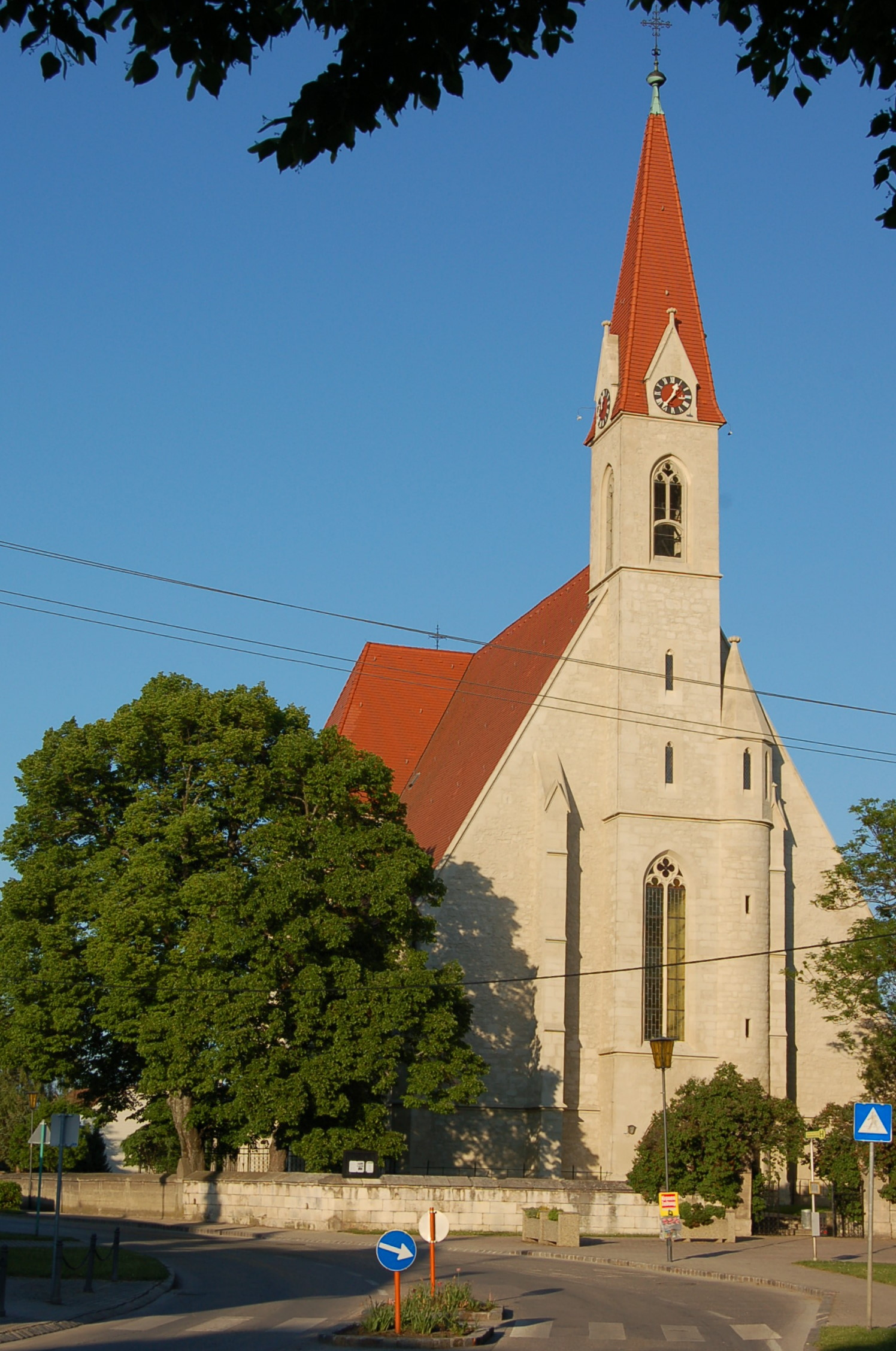
St. Jacob parish church
