= Ben Shaoul =

American real estate owner and developer

- Born: March 7, 1977 (age 49)
- Occupation: real estate developer
- Known for: co-founder of Magnum Real Estate Group
- Spouse: Megan Walsh
- Children: four
- Parent(s): Minoo Shaoul; Abraham Shaoul

Ben Shaoul is a New York City-based real estate owner and developer. He is the president of Magnum Real Estate Group, a residential real estate development and management company headquartered in New York City. Shaoul is best known as a prominent developer in the Manhattan borough of New York City.

== Early life ==
Shaoul was born in Forest Hills, Queens, New York City to an Iranian Jewish family, the son of Abraham and Minoo Shaoul. His father ran an antiques business. He grew up in Great Neck, New York. He briefly attended community college but dropped out at the age of 19.

== Career ==
After he left school, he interned for a summer with a New York-based developer run by the Ohebshalom family, (also of Persian Jewish heritage). He oversaw the renovation of his father's property and later took out a mortgage on the building. In 1998, he and his parents co-founded Magnum Real Estate Group. In 1999, Shaoul used the proceeds from that mortgage to buy his first property, which was located on Mott Street in Nolita. Shaoul purchases buildings that have not been renovated for a long time and renovates them, and then increases the rent. He primarily focuses on the East Village has added luxury apartments on top existing buildings.

In 2013, Shaoul and Magnum Real Estate Group opened Bloom62, a luxury apartment building located in the East Village. Shaoul and Westbrook Partners sold a jointly-held investment portfolio of 17 properties for $130 million to Jared Kushner in February of that year. He later partnered with SL Green Realty to acquire properties in Williamsburg, Brooklyn. Shaoul also began developing a dormitory for the School of Visual Arts in Manhattan and ventured into Tribeca where he purchased the top 22 floors of the 32 story art-deco Verizon Building for conversion to condominiums. In July 2014, he purchased the 199-unit Post Toscana on the Upper East Side and the 138-unit Post Luminaria in Kips Bay for $270 million to convert into condominiums. Both buildings have soon-to-expire tax abatements thereafter exempting them from rent stabilization rules.

Shaoul has acquired and sold over 100 properties, including everything from the renovation of thousands of apartments to a $500M condominium conversion.

== Personal life ==
Shaoul is married to Megan Walsh Shaoul. They have three children: Henry, Piper, and Mayer. He has been criticized for contributing to the decline of rent-regulated apartments in the East Village. He was labeled "Sledgehammer Shaoul" after confronting tenants in a building he purchased and being photographed with construction workers holding sledgehammers and crowbars. In 2014, he was sued by his parents for using the proceeds from the refinancing of co-owned assets to fund his development projects. The dispute was later resolved.
