= Baba'i ben Farhad =

Persian-Jewish historian

Baba'i ben Farhad (Persian: بابایی بن فرهاد, Hebrew: באבאי בן פרהאד) was a Persian-Jewish chronicler, poet, and historian, the author of the Kitāb-i Sar Guzasht-i Kāshān dar bab-i 'Ibri va guyimiyi Sani (The Book of Events in Kashan Concerning the Jews; The Second Conversion), a chronicle of the forcible conversion event of the Jews of Kashan, Isfahan, and Hamadan, and related hardships from 1721–31, particularly in 1729 and 1730. It is modelled on the work of his grandfather, Baba'i ben Lotf, after which it is the 2nd known Persian-Jewish chronicle. Like his grandfather, he was crypto-Jewish i.e. he practiced Judaism while professing Islam outwardly.

The chronicle covers the downfall of the Safavid dynasty during the Afghan invasion of Iran from 1722-1730. It is written in Persian in Hebrew script., or Judeo-Persian. It is written in verse in the style of classical Persian poetry and includes Persian colloquialisms and Sufi references. ben Farhad is critical of Nader Shah, who expelled Ashraf Shah and demanded money from the Jewish community. Nader, who had adopted the title Ṭahmāsp Qulī Khān, imposed heavy taxes and plundered the towns on his way through the area, leading to the Jews' conversion to avoid further demands and loss of lives. The synagogues were later able to reopen. Ben Farhad also experienced the invasions of the Ottomans and the Russians.

== Works ==
- "Kitāb-i Sar-guzasht-i Kāshān (The Book of Events in Kashan) | Posen Library". www.posenlibrary.com.
