= Fred Ohebshalom =

American real estate developer (born 1952)

- Born: May 23, 1952 (age 73); Tehran, Iran
- Education: Pace University (BA)
- Occupation: Real estate developer
- Known for: Founder of Empire Management
- Spouse: Yvonne Ohebshalom
- Children: 4

Fred Ohebshalom (born 1952) is an American real estate developer and founder of Empire Management.

As of 2014, he owned over 100 apartment buildings in Manhattan.

== Early life ==
Ohebshalom was born to an Iranian Jewish family in Tehran, Iran. In 1964, he emigrated to the United States where he graduated with a B.A. in Business Administration from Pace University.

== Career ==
In 1975, he purchased his first building in Rego Park, Queens. He built the company by focusing on purchasing modest-size rental buildings in Manhattan.

In 2011, he made a foray into large scale development with the purchase of 111 Washington Street in the Financial District for $50 million after the owner defaulted; three years later, thanks to a boom in financial district real estate, it was listed for sale at $260 million. He then planned to build a 54-story tower on the site.

Although he has been criticized for raising the rent after rent stabilized tenants move out, New York State law allows a 17-20% increase to rent if a rent stabilized tenant vacates.

In 2011, 357 West 45th Street, a property owned by Ladera Partners, LLC, a company owned by the Ohebshalom family, was foreclosed upon; in 2012, Ladera sought the subsequent sale of the property to be vacated and the property returned to their ownership. The request was denied due to the fact that "Ladera defaulted on its mortgage in early 2010...Ladera failed to pay taxes and failed to maintain the building, allowing serious conditions of disrepair to develop in occupied residential buildings."

== Philanthropy ==
Ohebshalom sits on the boards of the Iranian American Jewish Committee and of the Bet Hadassah Iranian Jewish Center. He has also served as president of the Sephardic Heritage Alliance and represents the Iranian community on the board of the Hebrew Immigrant Aid Society. He is a benefactor of the Parviz Ohebshalom Cancer Pain and Palliative Medicine Clinic at Shaare Zedek Medical Center in Jerusalem (named in honor of his brother) and Meir Panim which is dedicated to feeding hungry Israelis. He was an early founder of the Beth Hadassah Synagogue in Great Neck, New York.

== Personal life ==
Ohebshalom lives in Kings Point, New York with his wife Yvonne; they have four children: Richard, Sandy, Alex and Stephanie. His son Alexander serves as Vice President at Empire Management.

His son Richard is also the CEO and Founder of the real estate development firm, Pink Stone Capital. His brother Nader is President of residential and commercial property management company Gatsby Enterprises. Real estate developer Ben Shaoul interned with his company.
