= Henryk Lipszyc =

Polish Jewish scientist and Japanese specialist

Henryk Lipszyc (born 1941) is a Polish scientist of Jewish ancestry, specialist in Japanese culture, theatre and a translator from Japanese. In 1964 he graduated from the Warsaw University. Between 1972 and 1978 he studied at various Japanese universities, including University of Waseda and University of Tokyo, thanks to a scholarship of the Ministry of Education of Japan. In 1987 he was a visiting professor at the Faculty of Studies on Orient at the University of Tel Aviv.

Upon his return to Poland, he became a professor at the Department of Japanese and Korean Studies of the Institute of Oriental Studies at the University of Warsaw. He also became one of the most notable translators of Japanese books to Polish, including works by Kenko, Sato Makoto, Abe Kobo, Kawabata Yasunari and Mishima Yukio. He also authored numerous texts on Polish-Japanese relations and Japanese theatre in both Poland and Japan. Between 1991 and 1996 he served as the ambassador of Poland in Tokyo. Also, between 1991 and 2000 and the since 2003 he heads the Department of Japanese and Korean Studies and works as a professor at the Collegium Civitas.

Finally, he is also an active member of the Warsaw Jewish commune. For his work on translating the most valuable pieces of Japanese literature and advertising modern Japanese culture, in 1992 Lipszyc was awarded the Order of the Rising Sun. After the Expo 2005 he was also awarded the Golden Cross of Merit of the Republic of Poland.
