= Emmanuel Metter =

Russian conductor (1878–1941)

Emmanuel Leonievich Metter
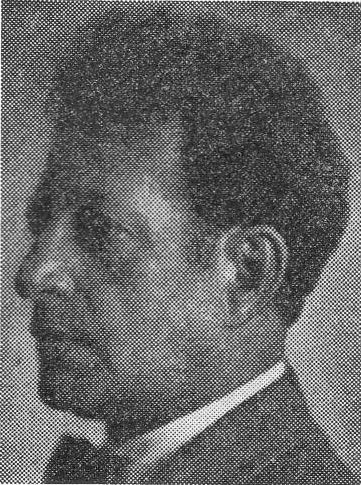
- Born: February 28, 1878; Kherson, Russian Empire
- Died: August 28, 1941 (aged 63); West Hollywood, California
- Resting place: Hollywood Memorial Park Cemetery
- Occupations: conductor, educator

Emmanuel Leonievich Metter (February 28, 1878 – August 28, 1941) was a Russian conductor.

Emmanuel Metter was born in Kherson, Russian Empire, in a Jewish family running a business. He entered the faculty of medicine at the Imperial University of Kharkov on August 26, 1897; however, he transferred to the faculty of law on September 7, 1898, graduated in 1906 and became a lawyer. He then entered the Saint Petersburg Conservatory as an unregistered student in September 1906 and studied under Nikolai Rimsky-Korsakov and Alexander Glazunov. He left the conservatory in May 1907, taught at Moscow Conservatory and conducted at the Bolshoi Theatre. When Metter was a conductor at the opera house in Kazan, Russia, he married Elena Osovskaya, a Polish prima ballerina of the opera house.

Right before the Russian Revolution (1917) they exiled themselves to Harbin, Republic of China and Metter became conductor of Harbin Symphony Orchestra. In early 1920s Osovskaya was invited to become a professor at the Takarazuka Revue in Takarazuka, Hyogo Prefecture, Japan, then Metter moved to Japan also in March 1926. They lived in Kobe, Hyogo Prefecture and Metter succeeded Heinrich Werckmeister and became conductor of the NHK Osaka Broadcasting Station (JOBK) Orchestra in Osaka, Japan. He also conducted Kyoto Imperial University orchestra for more than ten years. Metter taught many significant Japanese musicians, such as Takashi Asahina and Ryoichi Hattori.

Metter and Osovskaya moved to Los Angeles, California, on October 6, 1939. Metter died on August 28, 1941, in West Hollywood, California, of heart disease. Osovskaya died in 1964 at the age of 83. Metter and Osovskaya are buried in Hollywood Memorial Park Cemetery.
