= Ofer Feldman =

Israeli-born Japanese professor

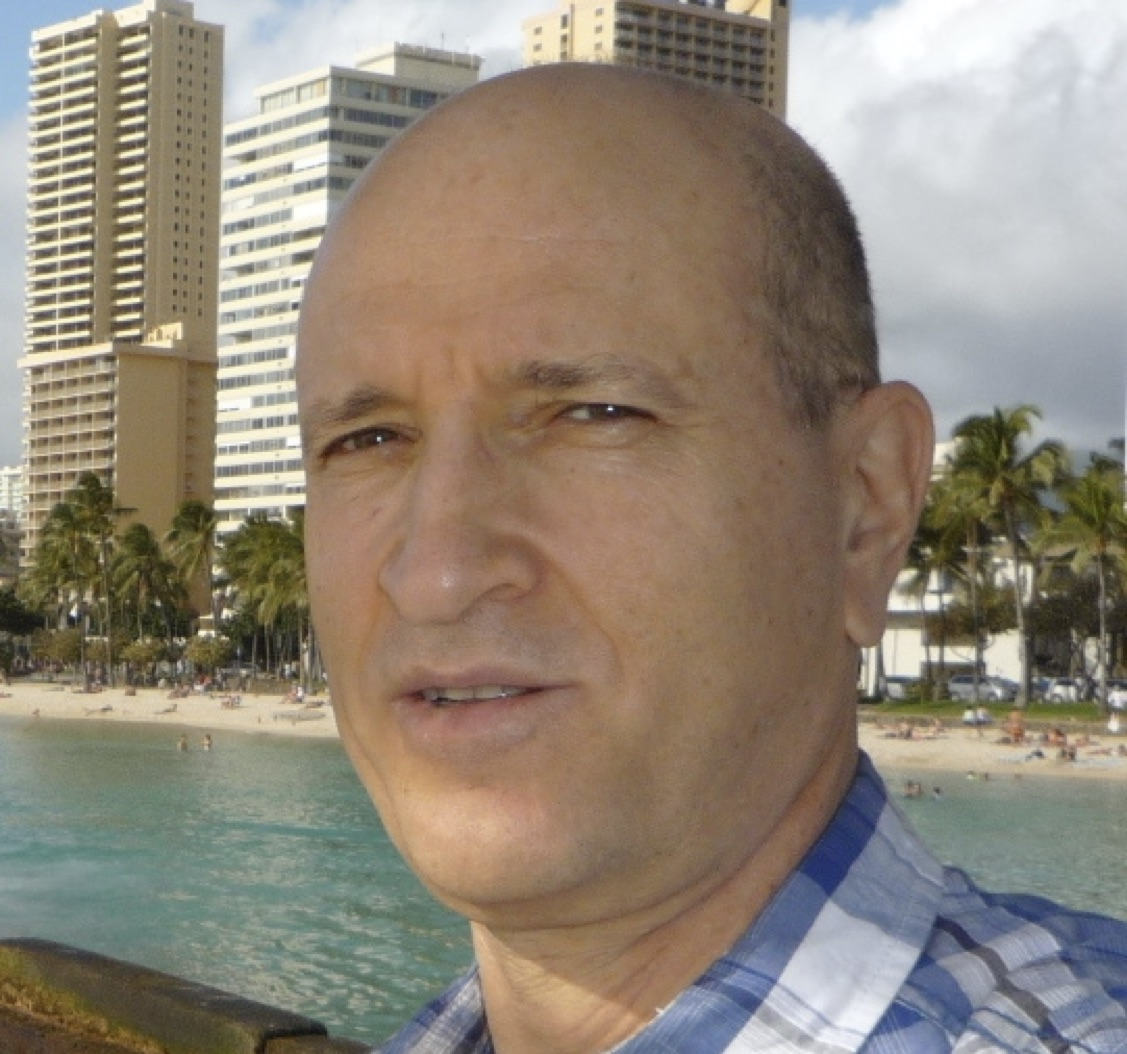
Ofer Feldman

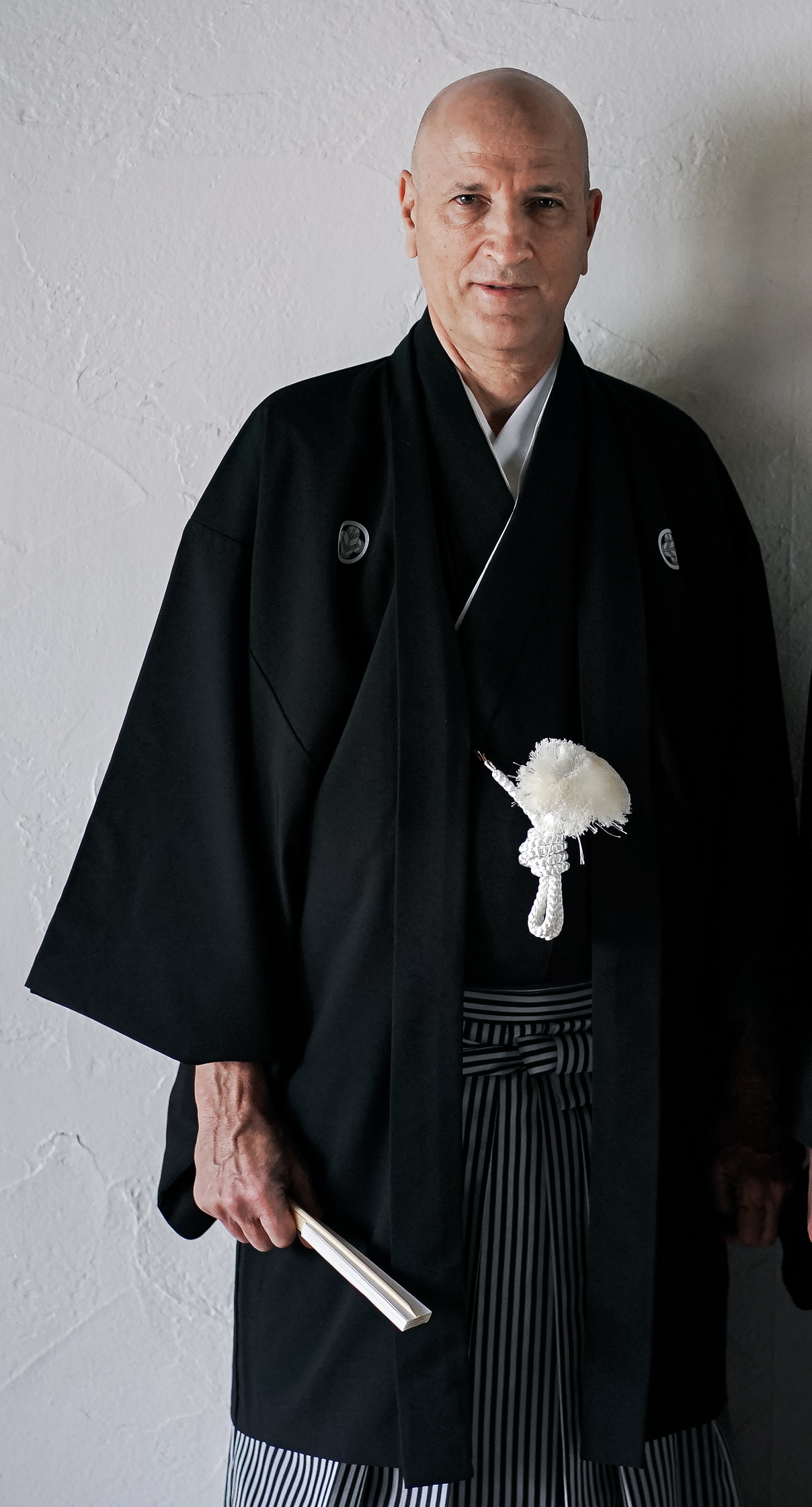

Ofer Feldman (Japanese: オフェル・フェルドマン; Hebrew: עפר פלדמן) is an Israeli-born Japanese and Professor Emeritus of Political Psychology, and Adjunct Researcher, Doshisha University; & Affiliated Professor, Center for Southeast Asian Studies, Kyoto University, Kyoto, Japan. He is a former president of the Psycho-Politics (currently Political Psychology) Research Committee of the International Political Science Association (IPSA).

Ofer Feldman was born in Israel and moved to Japan in 1982. In 1994 he became a Japanese citizen. He received his Ph.D. degree from the University of Tokyo (major: Social Psychology) in 1987. Since then he has published more than 100 book chapters and academic papers in various international journals. In addition, he has authored, co-authored, edited and co-edited 29 books and monographs on political psychology, Japanese political behavior and communication, political discourse, and political leadership and personality . He is the 1993 Recipient of the Erik H. Erikson Award for Distinguished Early Career Contribution to Political Psychology, from the International Society of Political Psychology. Other honors and awards include fellowships from Japan Foundation (1989, 1993), Japanese Ministry of Education (1990–2003, 2008–2011), Matsushita International Foundation (1993–94), Nomura Foundation (1994), Kikkoman Foundation (1996), Japan Society for the Promotion of Science (1999–2001, 2008–2010, 2012–2014, 2016–2018, 2019–2022, 2023–2025 (always principal investigator), Daiwa Anglo-Japanese Foundation (1999), Fulbright (2001–2002), Mershon Center, Ohio State University (2001–2002), Polish Academy of Science, Institute of Psychology & the Warsaw School of Social Psychology (2006), El Colegio de Veracruz, Mexico, (2007) and Lady Davis Fellowship, The Hebrew University of Jerusalem (2009–2010). He has held visiting and teaching professorships in British Columbia University, Tel Aviv University, York University (UK), Ohio State University, The Hebrew University, Queensland University, Leipzig University, and Tubingen University. He also served as the Chair [President] of the Psycho-Politics Research Committee within the International Political Science Association (tenure 2000–2006; 2012–2015). In 2021 he was elected Honorary Chair of the Research Committee on Political Psychology, International Political Science Association. He currently lives in Kyoto.

== Publications ==
(Selected Books):

- Feldman, O. (1989) 人間心理と政治：政治心理学入門 [Ningen shinri to seiji: Seiji shinrigaku nyumon (Human Psyche and Politics: Introductory to Political Psychology)]. Tokyo: Waseda Daigaku Shuppanbu, 218p. (in Japanese).
- Feldman, O. (1992) イメージで読む「永田町」: 政治的イメージの役割と構造に関する実証的研究 [Imeji de yomu nagatacho: Seijiteki imeji no yakuwari to kozo ni kansuru jisshoteki kenkyu (Perceiving Japanese Politics Through Images: An Empirical Study on the Role and Structure of Political Image)]. Tokyo: Miraisha, 270p.(in Japanese).
- Feldman, O. (1993) Politics and the News Media in Japan. Ann Arbor: The University of Michigan Press, 221p. (2nd and 3rd printings 1995).
- Feldman, O. (1999) The Japanese Political Personality: Analyzing the Motivations and Culture of Freshmen Diet Members. London: Macmillan & New York: St. Martin's Press, 182p. (in association with International Political Science Association's Advances in Political Science: An International Series)
- Feldman, O. (2004) Talking Politics in Japan Today. Brighton; UK, & Portland, Or; US: Sussex Academic Press, 214p. (paperback ed., May 2005).
- Feldman, O. (2006) 政治心理学 [Seiji Shinrigaku (Political Psychology)]. Kyoto: Mineruba Shobo, 340p. (in Japanese).
- Kinoshita, K. & Feldman, O. (2018) 政治家はなぜ質問に答えないか:インタビューの心理分析 [Seijika wa naze shitsumon ni kotaenai ka: Intabyu no shinri bunseki (Why Politicians Don't Answer Questions?: Psychological Analysis of Interviews)]. Kyoto: Mineruba Shobo, 293p. (in Japanese).
- Feldman, O. & Zmerli, S. (Eds.) (2019) The Psychology of Political Communicators: How Politicians, Culture, and the Media Construct and Shape Public Discourse. NY & London: Routledge (Routledge Studies in Political Psychology), 240p.
- Feldman, O. (Ed.) (2020) The Rhetoric of Political Leadership: Logic and Emotion in Public Discourse. Cheltenham, UK & Northampton, US: Edward Elgar, 250p.
- Feldman, O. (Ed.)(2021) When Politicians Talk: The Cultural Dynamics of Public Speaking. Singapore, Springer, 300p.
- Zmerli, S. & Feldman, O. (Eds.) (2022) Politische Psychologie: Handbuch für Studium und Wissenschaft. Baden-Baden, Germany: Nomos Verlagsgesellschaft, 2nd updated & extended edition, 475p. (in German).
- Feldman, O. (Ed.)(2022) Adversarial Political Interviewing: Worldwide Perspectives During Polarized Times. Singapore, Springer, 397p.
- Kinoshita, K. & Feldman, O.(2022) 政治家のレトリック: 言葉と表情が示す心理（Seijika no retorikku: Kotoba to hyōjō ga shimesu shinri [Politicians’ Rhetoric: The Psychology of Words and Facial Expressions]）. Tokyo: Keiso Shobo, 277p. (in Japanese).
- Feldman, O. (Ed.)(2023) Political Debasement: Incivility, Contempt, and Humiliation in Parliamentary and Public Discourse. Singapore, Springer, 250p.
- Feldman, O. (Ed.)(2023) Debasing Political Rhetoric: Dissing Opponents, Journalists, and Minorities in Populist Leadership Communication. Singapore, Springer, 237p.
- Feldman, O. (Ed.)(2024) Political Humor Worldwide: The Cultural Context of Political Comedy, Satire, and Parody. Singapore, Springer, 253p.
- Feldman, O. (Ed.)(2024) Communicating Political Humor in the Media: How Culture Influences Satire and Irony. Singapore, Springer, 309p.
- Feldman, O. (Ed.)(2025) Not My Words: How and Why Elected Officials Quote, Requote, and Misquote Others. Singapore, Springer, 309p.
- Feldman, O. (Ed.)(2026) The Transformation of Political Oratory: Argumentation and Style in the Modern Era. Singapore, Springer, 309p.
- Feldman, O. (Ed.)(2026) From Oratory to Colloquialism: Changes in Political Rhetoric Towards the Age of Populism. Singapore, Springer, 309p.
- Kinoshita, K. & Feldman, O. (2026) 令和日本の政治は「感情」で動く: 国会審議・街頭演説・ＳＮＳ戦略（Reiwa nihon seiji wa 'kanjō' de ugoku: Kokkai shingi, gaitō enzetsu, SNS senryaku [Politics in Reiwa-era Japan is Driven by “Emotion:” Parliamentary debates, street speeches, and social media strategies]）. Kyoto: Mineruba Shobo, 292p. (in Japanese).
