= Akhzivland =

Micronation

Coordinates: 33.04864°N 35.10177°E

Akhzivland מדינת אכזיב (Hebrew)
- Micronation (unrecognized entity)
- Area claimed: 0.014 square kilometres (0.0054 mi^{2})
- Claimed by: Eli Avivi
- Dates claimed: 1971–present

Akhzivland (Hebrew: מדינת אכזיב) is a micronation between the Israeli town of Nahariya and the Lebanese border on the Mediterranean coast of northern Israel, founded by Eli Avivi in 1971. The micronation is promoted by the Israel Ministry of Tourism.

== History ==
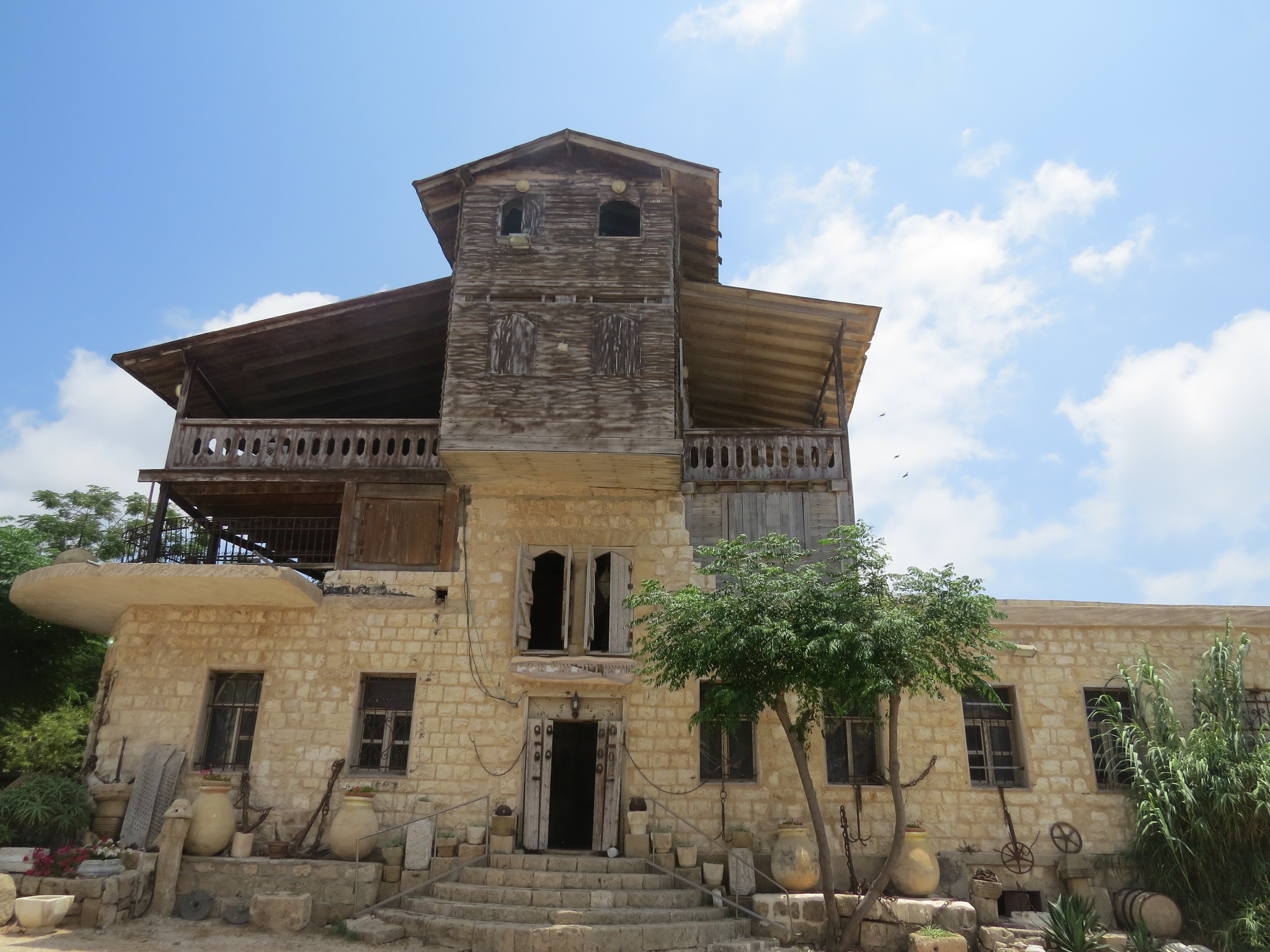
The Akhzivland Museum in 2015

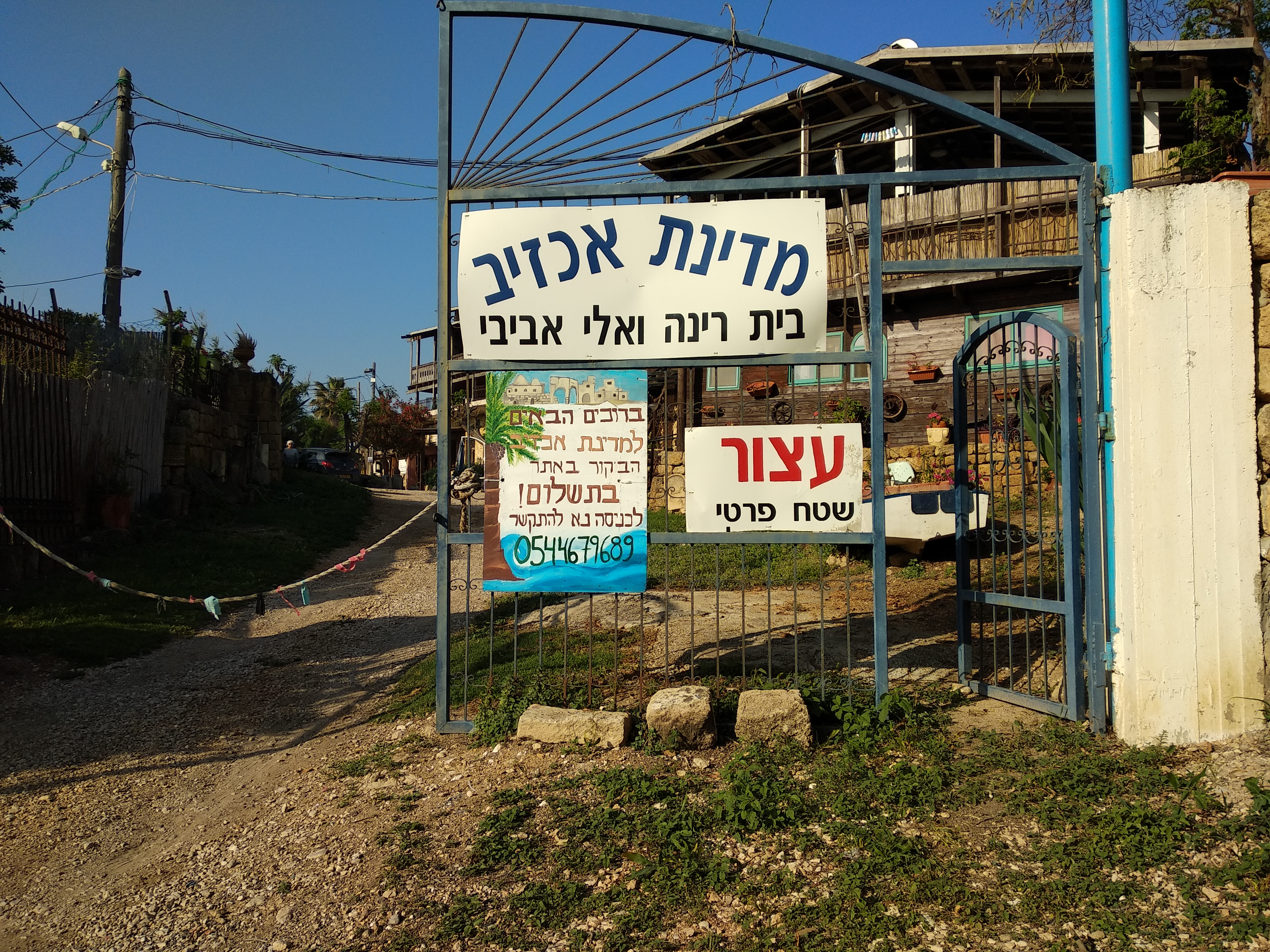
Entrance to Akhzivland

The micronation is located near the ruins of Achziv, a depopulated Palestinian village on the Mediterranean coast in the Western Galilee, from which the micronation's name is derived.

It is located about 5 km (3 miles) north of Nahariya. A national park, field school, and the ruins of the old village of Az-Zeeb, which was captured by the Carmeli Brigade during the 1948 Arab–Israeli War, are located nearby. The current site of Akhzivland is situated near the ancient port city of Achziv. Based on archeological findings and the numerous burial sites located in the region, it is thought that Achziv was already an important commercial center during the Iron Age. In the Book of Joshua, Achziv is mentioned as one of the nine cities of the Kingdom of Judah. A thriving city was also located on the site during the time of the Mishnah. During the Crusader period, the city was given as a gift to a knight. During the Mamluk period, it was conquered by the Mamluk general Baibars, who established a fishing village at the site called Az-Zeeb. Its residents fled Az-Zeeb during Operation Ben-Ami in the 1948 Arab–Israeli War.

In 1952, Iranian-born sailor and Palmach veteran Eli Avivi moved into buildings in the villages. According to former residents of Az-Zeeb, Avivi was hired by a family of fishermen, and later moved into the family's house in 1955.

In 1961, the Israeli government granted the French resort company Club Med a fifty-year lease over part of the area's coastline.

In 1970, the Israeli government sent bulldozers to demolish the home in which Avivi had been living. In protest, Eli founded Akhzivland in 1971, setting up a hostel and a museum inside the former home of the mukhtar of Az-Zeeb. The micronation became a tourist site—described by Haaretz as a "hippie micro state"—attracting artists, models, writers, politicians, and countercultural figures, including Shimon Peres, Bar Refaeli, Sophia Loren, and Paul Newman.

The micronation elected Avivi to be President (according to the constitution "The president is democratically elected by his own vote"), established a flag and national anthem, and even issued passports. For a certain time, visitors’ passports received a special stamp. Following the founding of Akhzivland, Avivi was arrested and detained, but was released 10 days later after a judge ruled that the charge of "Creation of a Country Without Permission" did not exist. After Avivi sued the Israeli government, a court ruled to lease the area to Avivi for 99 years, but did not rule on the legal status of the state.

In 1971, six Palestinian gunmen belonging to Fatah (back then known as the "Palestinian National Liberation"), infiltrated Israel by sea from Lebanon with the intention of kidnapping Avivi, landing on the beach of Achziv. One of the gunmen entered the house but was stopped at gunpoint by Avivi's wife, Rina, dropping his weapon and a bag of grenades. Two more gunmen were caught by the Israel Defense Forces (IDF) at the boat, while the other three were captured inland.

Akhzivland now contains a guest house, beachfront campground, and a museum of local findings from the sea and seashore.

Eli Avivi died of pneumonia on 16 May 2018, at the age of 88.

== Flag ==
The Flag of Akhzivland

The flag of Akhzivland is a Spanish fess with one yellow stripe in between two blue stripes, the top stripe a lighter shade of blue than the lower. It has two images in white depicted on it. The rightmost image is a building representing the Akhzivland Museum, which is the main building in Akhzivland. The leftmost image depicts a mermaid resembling the one in the flag of Eemsmond, a Dutch municipality.

== See also ==
- List of micronations
- Galilee
