= Ben-Ami Shillony =

Israeli professor of Japanese history

- בן-עמי שילוני
- Born: 28 October 1937 (age 88); Poland
- Occupation: Professor emeritus of Japanese history
- Known for: Contributions to Japanese history studies
- Spouse: Lena Shillony
- Awards: Israel Prize for Far Eastern Studies (2021)

Ben-Ami Shillony (Hebrew: בן-עמי שילוני; born October 28, 1937 (?), Poland) is professor emeritus of Japanese history at the Hebrew University of Jerusalem. In 2021, he was awarded the Israel Prize for Far Eastern Studies.

His wife was Lena Shillony, professor emerita of French literature at the Hebrew University of Jerusalem.

== Selected publications ==
- Revolt in Japan. Princeton University Press, 1973. Translated into Japanese: Nihon no hanran, Kawade Shobō Shinsha, 1975.
- Politics and Culture in Wartime Japan. Clarendon Press, Oxford, 1981. Paperback edition Oxford University Press, 1991. Translated into Japanese: Uotaimu japan, Gogatsu Shobō, 1991.
- Yapan hamesoratit: tarbut ve-historia. Schocken Publishing House, 1995. Revised and expanded edition, 2001.
- Yapan hamodernit: tarbut ve-historia. Schocken Publishing House, 1997. Revised and expanded edition, 2002.
- The Jews and the Japanese. Charles E. Tuttle, 1992. Translated into Japanese: Yudayajin to nihonjin no fushigina kankei, Seikō Shobō, 2004.
- Collected Writings of Ben-Ami Shillony. Japan Library, Curzon Press, 2000.
- Enigma of the Emperors: Sacred Subservience in Japanese History. Global Oriental, 2005. Translated into Japanese: Haha naru tennō, Kōdansha, 2003.
- The Emperors of Modern Japan. Brill, 2008. (Editor)
- Yapan bemabat ishi. Schocken Publishing House, Tel Aviv, 2011.
