= Yaacov Liberman =

Israeli Zionist politician and author (1923–2015)

- יעקב ליברמן
- Born: March 10, 1923; Harbin, China
- Died: August 27, 2015 (aged 92); San Diego, California, U.S.
- Occupations: Zionist politician and author

Yaacov (Yana) Liberman (Hebrew: יעקב ליברמן; March 10, 1923 – August 27, 2015) was a Chinese-born Israeli Zionist politician and author. In 1948 he emigrated to Israel.

== Life and career ==
Liberman was born in Harbin, China on March 10, 1923, into a wealthy Russian Jewish family, to Semyon Liberman from Sevastopol and Gisia Zuboreva from Nikolayevsk-on-Amur. He had three brothers. Liberman was a Zionist leader in Shanghai and wrote two books: My China: Jewish Life in the Orient: 1900–1950 and Tears of Zion: Divided We Stand. He died in San Diego, California on August 27, 2015, at the age of 92.
