= George W. F. Hallgarten =

American historian

George (born Georg) Wolfgang Felix Hallgarten (January 3, 1901 – May 22, 1975) was a German-born American historian.

== Life ==
Hallgarten was born on January 3, 1901 in Munich. He was a student of Max Weber at the LMU Munich for a short time. In 1925, he became Dr. phil. in Munich, taught by Hermann Oncken and Karl Alexander von Müller. In 1933, he moved to Paris to flee the Nazis, mainly due to his Marxist approach and his pacifist conviction, as his mother was the German pacifist Constanze Hallgarten.

Hallgarten's grandfather Charles Hallgarten had U.S. citizenship already, but G. W. F. Hallgarten had to re-naturalize as an American in 1942. Afterwards, he took part in the U.S. war effort during World War II, working for the psychological warfare division (PWD).

When World War II ended, Hallgarten returned to the United States, working as a historian, initially for the U.S. Army. When the Cold War evolved, he refused to work for the Army and resigned. He was a guest professor several times: in the U.S., in Germany, Japan (1965), India (1965) and Italy (1967), without a tenured professorship until 1972. Then he became Robert Lee Bailey professor at the University of North Carolina in Charlotte.

Hallgarten died on May 22, 1975 in Washington, D.C.

== Literary works ==
- Imperialismus vor 1914, 1951 (in German)
- "帝国主義と現代", 1967 (in Japanese)
- Why dictators?, 1967
- Das Wettrüsten, 1967 (in German)
- Hitler, Reichswehr, Industrie, 1955 (in German)
- Als die Schatten fielen, 1969 (in German), (self biography)
- Deutsche Industrie und Politik, 1974 (in German), (collaboration with J. Radkau)
