= Fumiko Kometani =

Japanese author

Fumiko Kometani (米谷ふみ子, Kometani Fumiko, born 1930 in Osaka, Japan) is a Japanese author and artist (painter) and a longtime resident of the United States. Kometani moved to the US in 1960 when she was working as an abstract painter, spending time at the MacDowell Colony in New Hampshire where she met her husband, Josh Greenfeld (they later moved to California). She changed her focus to writing when her developmentally disabled son Noah became too hard to handle when he was around the art supplies in her studio. Her older son, Karl Taro Greenfeld, is also a writer.

Kometani is also noted for her expressed displeasure of what she terms the fascist mentality of the World War II Japanese Army. She regularly participates in anti-war and anti-nuclear protests.

Her first book, Passover, received the distinguished Akutagawa Prize. It was subsequently described in The New York Times as "anti-Semitic" and an example of Japan's "widespread anti-Semitism", although Kometani's husband is Jewish, and the novel was an adaption of a visit to his parents' house. A judge for the Akutagawa Prize claimed that the Times had misinterpreted the sardonic and self-ridiculing tone of the novel.

In January 2025 Kometani's home was destroyed in the Palisades Fire.

== Awards ==
- Bungakkai shinjinshoo (1985)
- Shinchoo shinjinshoo (1985)
- Akutagawashoo (1985) (One of the most prestigious literary awards in Japan)
- Murasaki Shikibu Prize (1998)
