= Kurt Singer =

German economist and philosopher

Kurt Singer (May 12, 1886 – February 14, 1962) was a German economist and philosopher.

Born in Magdeburg, he was a professor at Hamburg University (1924–1933). He taught at the Tokyo Imperial University from 1931 to 1935.

Singer died at Athens at the age of 75.

== Literary works ==
- On the crisis of present-day Japan, 1932
- Das Geld als Zeichen, 1920
- Platon und das Griechentum, 1920
- Platon der Gründer, 1927
