= Ilyas Malayev =

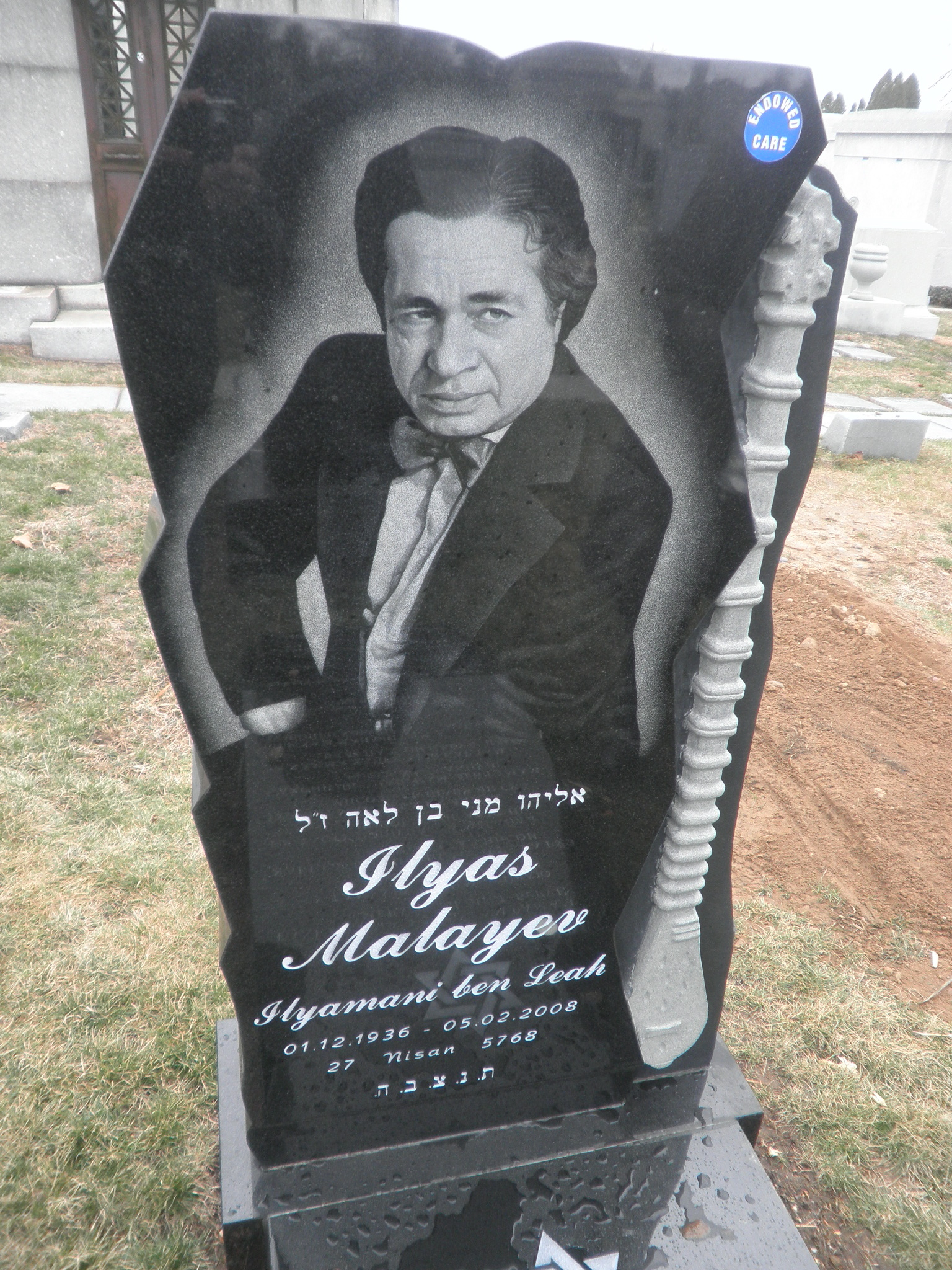
- Grave of Mallayev with an homage to his beloved instrument, the tambur, carved into the stone at Mount Carmel Cemetery in Queens, NY, USA

Background information
- Born: January 12, 1936; Merv, Turkmen SSR, Soviet Union
- Died: May 2, 2008 (aged 72) Flushing, Queens, New York City, New York, USA
- Occupations: Musician, poet, playwright
- Instruments: Tar, Tanbur, Violin
- Years active: 1945–2008
- Website: http://ilyasmalayev.com
- Awards: Honored Artist of Uzbekistan

Ilyas Malayev (January 12, 1936 – May 2, 2008) was a musician and poet.

Malayev was born in the city of Merv (today in Mary, Turkmenistan) to a Bukharian Jewish family and raised in the town of Katta-Kurgan. He learned to play the tar and the tanbur (both lute-like instruments), as well as the violin, and immersed himself in the shashmaqam genre. In 1951, he moved to Tashkent, where he performed with various state-sponsored ensembles, and became popular as a variety entertainer, performing comedy routines, his own songs and poetry and Shashmaqom excerpts. Tens of thousands of fans attended his stadium performances. He was later named "Honored Artist of the Uzbek SSR".

In 1994, following the breakup of the Soviet Union, Malayev emigrated to the United States where he settled in Queens, New York City along with thousands of other Bukharian Jews. Although it was a considerable step down from his fame and popularity in Uzbekistan, Malayev emigrated as he was unable to have his poetry published in his homeland, a restriction he suspected was due to either anti-Semitism or the state of the cultural bureaucracy. He was granted U.S. citizenship on November 15, 2001.

Malayev died on May 2, 2008, aged 72, after suffering from pancreatic cancer.

On May 29, 2011, in Queens, NY, USA, an honorary concert celebrating Ilyas' 75th year in his memory was held where various Bukharian Jewish and Uzbek performers gave tribute to the virtuoso.
