= Shifra Horn =

Israeli writer (born 1951)

Shifra Horn (Hebrew: שפרה הורן; born 1951) is an Israeli author.

== Biography ==
Shifra Horn was born in Tel Aviv. She lives in the Old Malcha neighbourhood of Jerusalem and in Auckland, New Zealand. She attended high school in the Hebrew University Secondary School. After majoring in Bible Studies and Archeology - BA (Hons)- at the Hebrew University of Jerusalem, she earned an MA in Bible Studies. Horn also studied mass communications and completed a teaching degree.

Horn worked as an educational officer for the World Union of Jewish Students, and helped to organize the airlift of Ethiopian Jews to Israel. Horn also participated in the campaign to free Soviet and Syrian Jews, producing films and written material.

In the course of her work with Jewish students from oppressed communities around the world, she visited a village of Jewish Marranos who had kept their Jewish identity secret for over 500 years. Horn's activity in the village of Belmonte in northwest Portugal resulted in the entire population converting fully to Judaism.

Horn was a spokesperson for the Israel Absorption Ministry until her departure for Japan, where she served as Far East correspondent for the Israel Defense Forces Radio station and Ma'ariv daily newspaper for five years. Horn worked as the director of the Tokyo Jewish Community Center and taught Bible Studies and Hebrew at the Bible College in Ginza, Tokyo.

Upon her return to Jerusalem, she opened a public relations firm, and lectured on Japan and literary topics. Her books have been translated from Hebrew into English, French, Dutch, German, Italian, Greek, Mandarin and Turkish.

== Published work ==
- Novels:
  - Four Mothers
  - The Fairest Among Women
  - Tamara Walks On Water
  - Ode to Joy
  - Promenade A Deux
- Non-fiction:
  - Shalom Japan
  - Cats
  - A Love story
  - The New Zealand Experience
- Children's Book:
  - The Perfect Pet
  - Not by Day and Not by Night

== Awards and recognition ==
Horn won the Israeli WIZO Prize for Literature (1997) and the Israeli Publishers` Association's Gold and Platinum Book Prizes for all five of her novels. She won the Globes Financial Newspaper prize "Literary Woman of the Year" 2002, and received the Prime Minister's Prize (2005) and the Brenner Prize (2006). In addition Shifra Horn won the French WIZO Literary Prize and the Italian ADEI WIZO Prize for the novel "Ode to Joy". Her latest novel "Promenade A Deux" won the culture minister award.
