= Moussa Kermanian =

Iranian businessman (1922–1980)

- Born: 1922
- Died: 1980 (aged 57–58); Los Angeles, USA
- Occupations: Lawyer; Businesspeople; Journalist

Moussa Kermanian (1922–1980) was one of the leading Iranian Jewish community leaders, a lawyer, businessman and journalist. He was the secretary of the Jewish Community of Iran. He is known for his attempts to save his fellow Iranian Jews following the regime change in the country in 1979.

== Biography ==
Kermanian was born in 1922. In 1943 he established and headed a youth club called Kanun-e Javanan-e Iran (Persian: Iranian Youth Club). He received a degree in law.

He was one of the early Iranian Jews who advocated the rights of the group during the Pahlavi regime. He served as the secretary of the Jewish Community of Iran. He published various articles about the history and status of Jews in Iran and launched a newspaper, Alam-i Yahud (Persian: The Jewish World), in Iran. Kermanian left Iran before 1979 and started his real estate company in Los Angeles which he managed with his son, Sam.

Kermanian organized a meeting with American President Jimmy Carter at the White House in 1980 and headed the delegation composed of the Iranian Jews who left Iran because of the negative conditions as a result of the religious government established in 1979. Kermanian was assisted by his son, Sam, in this activity. This meeting made it possible for the Iranian Jews to settle in the USA.

Kermanian died of a heart attack in 1980. As of 2001 his son, Sam, was the president of the Iranian-American Jewish Federation based in West Hollywood, California.
