= Ludwig Riess =

German historian (1861–1928)

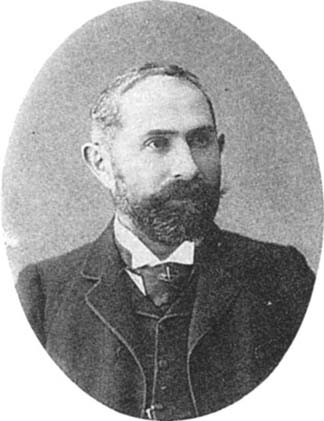
- Ludwig Riess
- Born: 1 December 1861; Deutsch-Krone, Prussia
- Died: 27 December 1928 (aged 67); Springfield, Ohio, United States
- Occupations: historian, educator, foreign advisor to Japan
- Known for: Foreign advisor to Meiji Japan

Ludwig Riess (1 December 1861 – 27 December 1928) was a German-born historian and educator, noted for his work in late 19th century Japan.

== Biography ==
Riess was born in Deutsch-Krone, Prussia (present-day Wałcz, West Pomeranian Voivodeship), as the youngest of five children in a German Jewish family. He was proficient in mathematics and physics as a child, and encouraged by his family to become an engineer or architect. However, he was more interested in world history, and chose to pursue an academic career over their wishes and studied at the University of Berlin. He is considered to be influenced in his methodology by the renowned historian Leopold von Ranke.

In 1884 Riess traveled to Great Britain and Ireland for the purpose of collecting materials for his doctoral dissertation "The vote of the British Parliament in the medieval ages", and received his doctorate at the age of 24. He returned to the British Isles again in 1885 and 1886 to collect additional materials pertaining to German history and the Hanseatic League.

Riess was recruited as a foreign advisor by the Meiji government of the Empire of Japan in 1887 to establish Western methods of historiography into the Japanese university curriculum. These methods included a reliance on primary sources, an emphasis on narrative history and a commitment to writing history from a neutral point of view, without moral judgements on past events. Riess was initially hired on a three-year contract, which was renewed several times. He taught at Tokyo Imperial University、Keio University, where he introduced Ranke's research methods of historical research, and introduced European archival materials, especially Dutch sources preserved at The Hague relevant to the study of Japanese history. Riess himself made a personal search for documents when he visited Europe on leave in 1893, visiting The Hague, London, and Rome, and sending back handwritten copies and excerpts from Dutch manuscripts.

Riess lectured on a wide variety of topics, including Taiwan history, modern European history, British Constitutional history, German history, the Franco-Prussian War, the French Revolution, William Adams and the role of the Portuguese and Dutch merchants in the Edo period. He was also a constant contributor of essays and reports to German newspapers and magazines on topics or events in Japan.

In 1888, Riess married a Japanese woman, Fuku Ōtsuka, the daughter of his cook, with whom he had one son and four daughters.

Riess was replaced as head of the history department of Tokyo Imperial University in 1901 by Genpachi Mitsukuri, and was given an annual pension of 500 yen. His contract was not renewed, as the Japanese government was cutting back on the number of o-yatoi gaikokujin, as their salaries were much higher than those of native Japanese, and many Japanese who had trained overseas were now returning and looking for work. Riess returned to the German Empire in 1902, and taught as an assistant professor at the University of Berlin.

In 1904, during the Russo-Japanese War, there was tremendous interest in Germany about all things Japanese, and Riess was in constant demand for articles about Japan and Japanese people for the German newspapers. During this period he published an autobiography the "Allerlei aus Japan" about his 15 years experiences in Japan.

In 1926, Riess visited Springfield, Ohio in the United States as an exchange teacher. Soon after arrival, he developed a fever and after a period of rest returned to Berlin. Two years later, in 1928, possibly due to allergic reaction after being stung by an insect, he died at the age of 67.

== Literary works ==
- Geschichte des Wahlrechts zum englischen Parliament, 1885
- Lectures in English constitutional history, 1891
- "Geschichte der Insel Formosa". Mitteilungen der Deutschen Gesellschaft für Natur- und Völkerkunde Ostasiens. 6. Tokyo: 405–47. April 1897.
- Allerei aus Japan, 2 Vols., 1904-1908
- Historik, 1912
- Die Entwicklung des modernen Japans, 1914
- Englische Geschichte, hauptsächlich in neuester Zeit, 1926
- Die Ursachen der Vertreibung der Portugiesen aus Japan, 1614-1639

== See also ==
- Shigaku zasshi
