= Max Janowski =

German composer (1912–1991)

Max Janowski (1912 – April 8, 1991) was a composer of Jewish liturgical music, a conductor, choir director, and voice teacher.

Born in Berlin into a musical family, Max was the son of Chaim Janowski, a choir director, and Miriam Rap-Janowska, an opera singer. As a youth, Max studied at the Klindworth-Scharwenka Conservatory (Klindworth-Scharwenka-Konservatorium) in Berlin. In 1933, he won a piano contest, which led to him becoming the head of the piano department at the Musashino Academia Musicae in Tokyo, Japan. He emigrated to the United States in 1937 and served in the U.S. Navy during World War II.

Max Janowski's choral works include the traditional Jewish prayers "Avinu Malkeinu" ("Our Father, Our King," a hymn for the High Holy Days), "Sim Shalom" ("Song of Peace," which was dedicated to the American diplomat Ralph Bunche), "Yismehu," and "ve-Shomeru".

From 1938 until his death, Janowski was the music director at KAM Isaiah Israel Congregation in Hyde Park in Chicago. On January 29, 2012, the centennial of his birth, a Gala Concert featuring several cantors, cantorial soloists, and area chorales was held at K.A.M. Isaiah Israel to celebrate Janowski's life and music.

Baritone Sherrill Milnes and mezzo-soprano Isola Jones studied with him.

He died in Hyde Park, Chicago.
