= Chaim Janowski =

Polish chess player and organizer

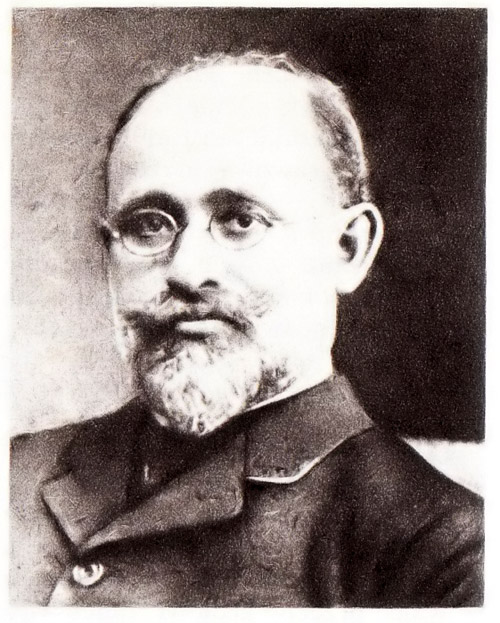

Chaim (Chajkel) Janowski (15 June 1853 in Wołkowysk – 10 January 1935 in Tokyo) was a Polish chess player and musician.

Born into a Jewish family in Wołkowysk (then Russian Empire), he was the older brother of Dawid Janowski. He was educated in Łódź (then Congress Poland) where he lived and played chess for many years. In local tournaments Chaim twice took fourth in 1897 (won by Wiktor Abkin) and 1898 (won by Gersz Salwe); won ahead of Samuel Rosenblatt, Abkin, Mojżesz Grawe, etc. in 1899/1900; and took third behind Salwe and Akiba Rubinstein in 1903/1904.

He was one of the founders of Music Association "Hazomir" in Łódź in 1901. Chaim Janowski became the second (after a Russian colonel Konstanty Manakin) president of the Łódź Chess Club (Łódzkie Towarzystwo Zwolenników Gry Szachowej) in 1907–1912. In that time, he was an organiser of the fifth All-Russian Masters Tournament (1907/1908), and tournaments in which Frank James Marshall and Efim Bogoljubow participated.

Afterwards he moved to Berlin, where his son Max Janowski was born in 1912. His wife Miriam Rap-Janowska, an opera singer, moved to Palestine in 1933. In 1934, he moved to Japan with Max. He died in Tokyo in 1935 and was buried in Yokohama, close to a local Jewish colony.
