= Bukharan Jews =

Jewish subgroup of Central Asia

יהודים בוכרים Бухарӣ
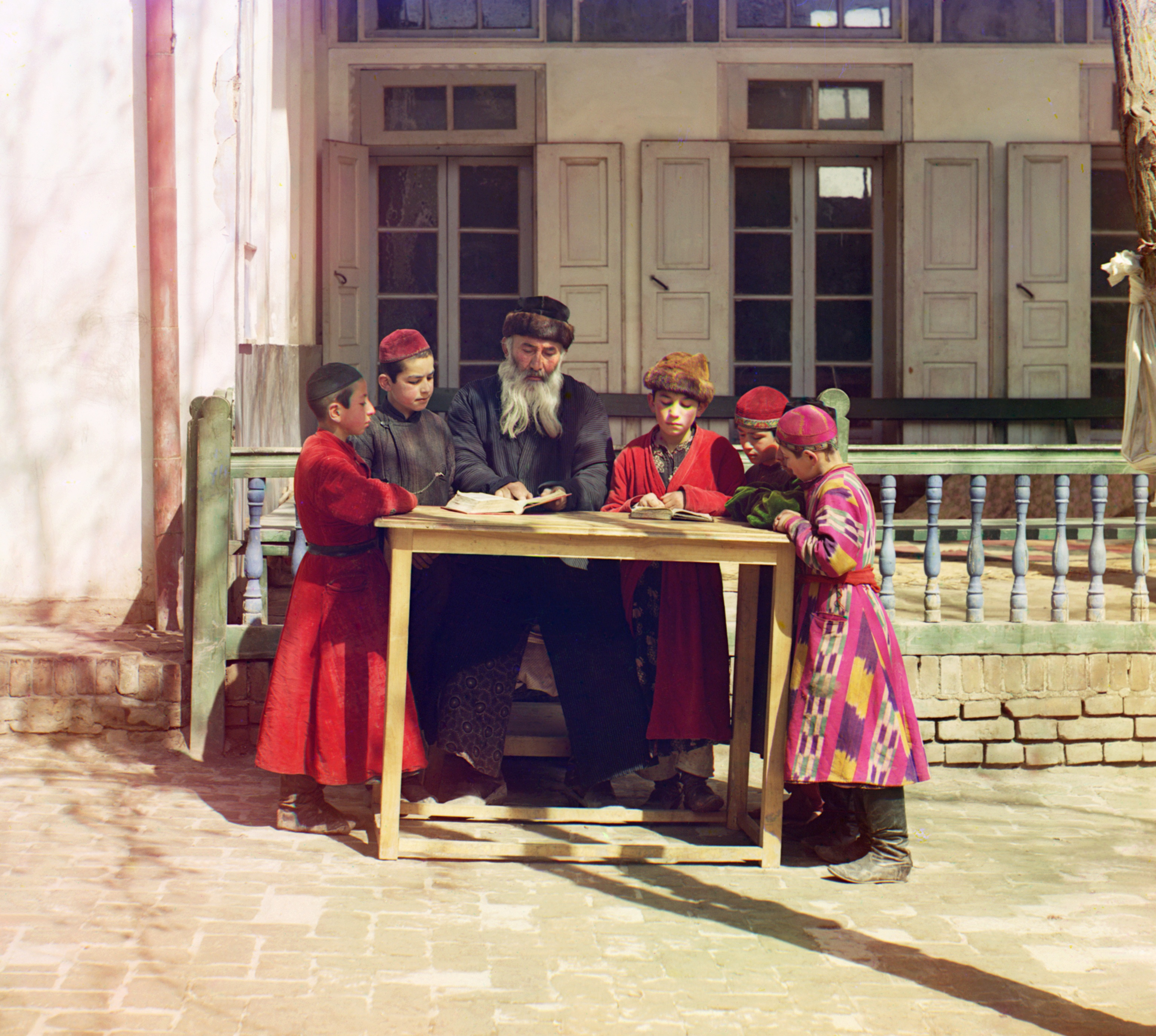
- Jewish children with their teacher in modern day Uzbekistan. Early 20th century color photograph by Sergey Prokudin-Gorsky.

Total population
- 300,000–350,000 (est.)

Regions with significant populations
- Israel: 160,000
- United States: New York metropolitan area (primarily Queens): 70,000
- United Kingdom: 15,000
- Austria: 3,000–3,500
- Germany: 2,000
- Uzbekistan: Bukhara: 1,500; 150
- Canada: 1,500
- Russia: 1,000
- Australia: Melbourne: 130+ 130+
- Tajikistan: 34

Languages
- Traditionally Bukharian (Judeo-Tajik), Russian, English (North America, United Kingdom), Hebrew (Israel), and Uzbek (Uzbekistan)

Religion
- Judaism

Related ethnic groups
- Iranian Jews, Iraqi Jews, Afghan Jews, Mountain Jews, Kurdish Jews, Georgian Jews, Mizrahi Jews, Soviet Jews

Bukharan Jews, (Note: Tajik: яҳудиёни Бухоро, romanized: yahudiyoni Buxoro, hebraized: יהודיאני בוכארא, arabized: یهودیان بخارا, pronounced [jɐɦudiˈjɔnɪ bʊχɔˈrɔ]; Hebrew: יְהוּדֵי־בּוּכָרָה, romanized: yehudi Bucharah, pronounced [jehuˈdi buχaˈʁa]; Uzbek: Бухоро яҳудийлари, romanized: Buxoro yahudiylari, hebraized: בוכארא יהודילר, pronounced [bʊχɒˈrɒ jɐhuˌdijlɐˈrɪ̆]; Russian: бухарец, romanized: buharec, IPA: [bʊˈxarʲɪts]; Turkmen: Бухара яхудилери, romanized: Buhara ýehudylary, arabized: بخارا یهوديلارى, pronounced [bʊχɑˈɾɑ jɛˌhʊdʊɫɑˈɾɯ̆]) also known as Bukharian Jews, (Note: Tajik: яҳудиёни Бухорӣ, romanized: yahudiyoni Buxoriy, hebraized: יהודי בוכרה, arabized: یهودیان بخارى, pronounced [jɐɦudiˈjɔnɪ bʊχɔˈɾij]; Hebrew: יְהוּדִים־בּוּכָרִים, romanized: yehudim Bucharim, pronounced [jehuˈdim buχaˈʁim]; Uzbek: Бухорий яҳудийлари, romanized: Buxoriy yahudiylari, hebraized: בוכרהי יהודילר, pronounced [bʊχɒˈrij jɐhuˌdijlɐˈrɪ̆]; Russian: Бухарские евреи, romanized: Buharskije jevrei, IPA: [bʊˈxarskʲɪje jɪˈvrʲeɪ]) are the Mizrahi Jewish sub-group of Central Asia that dwelt predominantly in what is today Uzbekistan, Tajikistan, Turkmenistan, and Kazakhstan. The group's name is derived from the Emirate of Bukhara, a polity that once had a sizable Jewish population.

Bukharan Jews are considered to be one of the oldest ethnoreligious groups in Central Asia, comprising a branch of Persian-speaking Jewry.

Since the dissolution of the Soviet Union, most Bukharan Jews have emigrated to Israel, the United States, Canada, Europe, and Australia, although small numbers remain in Tashkent, Bukhara and elsewhere across Central Asia.

== Name ==
The name used by the community to refer to themselves originally was Bnei Israel.

The term Bukharan Jew or Jew of Bukhara was first written in documents by the Russian Empire. The Jewish community at the time lived in the Khanate of Bukhara, the Khanate of Khiva, and the Khanate of Kokand, with the term "Bukharan" likely being coined as the Bukharan Emirate was the largest of the three khanates.

The local populace referred to them as Yahudi (یهودی) or Juhood (جهود)—the latter of which was a pejorative term.

== Language ==
Up until the 19th century, Persian speakers in Central Asia (including Jews) had no name for the dialect/language and simply regarded themselves as speaking Farsi. By then, Bukharan Jews had dubbed their Judeo-Persian language "Bukharian" or Bukhori, which is most similar to the Tajiki and Dari dialects of Farsi, with linguistic elements of Hebrew and Aramaic to communicate among themselves.

This language—along with Hebrew—was used for all cultural and educational life among the Jews. It was used widely until Central Asia was "Russified" by the Soviet Union and the dissemination of religious information was halted, as the Soviet Union wanted Russian as the lingua franca in the region.

During the Soviet era, the two main languages spoken by Bukharan Jews were Bukharian and Russian (some also spoke Uzbek, depending on where they worked or lived). The younger generation, those born outside Central Asia or who left the region as children, generally use Russian as their secondary language, some do understand or speak Bukhori.

== History and Origins ==
One legend has it that Bukharan Jews are the descendants of exiles who were members of the tribes of Naphtali and Issachar during the Assyrian captivity, basing this assumption on a reading of "Habor" at II Kings 17:6 as a reference to Bukhara. However, modern-day scholarship associates this legend with myths about the "Ten Lost Tribes", which were propagated in Europe.

When Central Asia was part of the Persian Empire, following the conquest of Babylonia by Cyrus the Great, Cyrus granted all of the Jews citizenship and he also permitted them to return to the province of Judah, however, a significant number of them chose to remain in Mesopotamia and later, they dispersed themselves throughout the Persian Empire. According to some scholars, Jews may have settled in Central Asia as early as the sixth century, though it is certain that by the eighth to ninth centuries, they lived in Central Asian cities such as Balkh, Khwarezm, and Merv. During this time, until approximately the 16th century, Bukharan Jews formed a culturally and religiously cohesive group with the Jews of Iran and Afghanistan.

The first primary written account of the history of the Jews in Central Asia dates back to the beginning of the 4th century CE. It is recalled in the Talmud by Rabbi Shmuel bar Bisna, a member of the Talmudic academy in Pumbeditha, who traveled to Margiana (present-day Merv in Turkmenistan). The presence of Jewish communities in Merv is also proven by Jewish writings on ossuaries from the 5th and 6th centuries, which were uncovered between 1954 and 1956.

In the 12th century, Benjamin of Tudela, a Jewish traveler from Spain, wrote of the populous Jewish community in Samarkand and claimed that there were about 50,000 "Israelites" in that city, among them "very wise and rich men". While the number is believed to have been exaggerated, it does point to a Jewish thriving community during that time.

In the 14th century, in the Timurid Empire ruled by Tamerlane, Jewish weavers and dyers contributed greatly to his effort to rebuild Central Asia following Genghis Khan and the Mongol invasions. Timur brought a number of Jewish silk-weaver families from Sabzevar, Shiraz, and Baghdad to Bukhara. In the centuries following Timur's demise, Jews came to dominate the region's textile and dye industry.

During the 16th century, the Jewish community that lived in the region was relatively small and scattered, numbering several thousand. In the 17th, 18th, and 19th century, there were migrations of Jews from various parts of the Middle East (via the Silk Road) who came for business, trade, or fleeing persecution from Iraq, Iran, Yemen, Syria, and Turkey, where the Jewish community grew exponentially.

=== Splintering of the Judeo-Persian communities ===
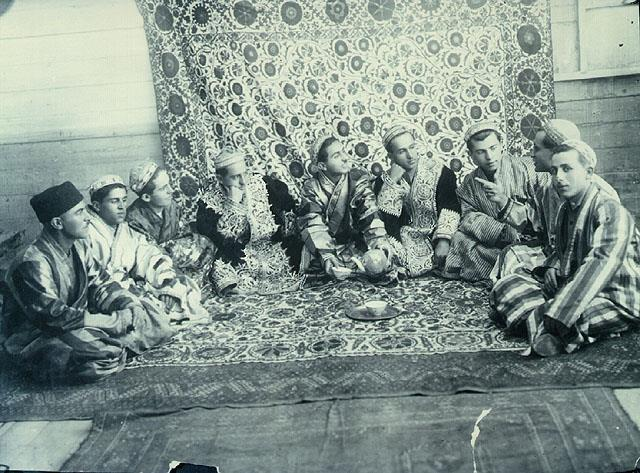
Jews from Mashad, Iran, and Jews from Soviet Uzbekistan meeting in Bukhara, c. 1930s

Until the start of the 16th century, the Jews of Iran and Central Asia constituted one community. However, during the Safavid dynasty, Iran adopted the Shia branch of Islam, while Central Asia retained their allegiance to the Sunni branch of Islam.

A similar event happened to the Jews of Afghanistan in the middle of the 18th century. The Durrani dynasty took control of the Afghani kingdom while the Manghud dynasty ruled the Emirate of Bukhara. Due to the hostile relationship between the two dynasties, the ties between the Jews of Afghanistan and Bukharan Jews were split into two similar but separate communities.

Over the centuries, whether it was to escape political turmoil, persecution, or to pursue economic opportunities, Jews from Iran and Central Asia would frequently migrate to each other's communities. Other Jews from Iran and Afghanistan migrated during the Russian conquest of Central Asia as the Russians had extended greater freedoms and economic opportunities for Jews. However, when Joseph Stalin and Soviet authorities consolidated their hold over the borders in Central Asia in the mid 1930s, living conditions for the Bukharan Jews deteriorated drastically, forcing a significant number of them to migrate to Iran or Afghanistan.

=== Under Sunni Muslim rule ===
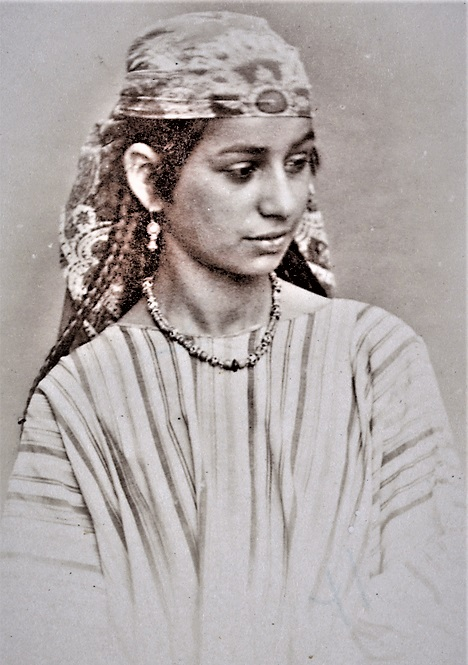
Bukharan Jewish girl, c. 1860s

In the Khanate of Bukhara, Bukharan Jews lived under the status of Dhimmi, and experienced a series of discriminatory practices from the Muslim majority. They were forced to wear clothing that identified them as Jews, such as a yellow patch, a hat called a Tilpak, and belts made of rope while the leather belts were reserved for Muslims. Jewish homes also had to be marked as "Jewish" with a dirty cloth nailed to their front doors, and their stores and homes had to be lower than Muslim ones. In court cases, any evidence from a Jew was inadmissible involving a Muslim. They were also forbidden to ride horses and donkeys and had to transport themselves by foot. Lastly, when paying their annual Jizya tax, the Jewish men would be ritually slapped in the face by Muslim authorities. Despite these prohibitions and humiliations, the Jews were able to achieve financial success primarily as merchants and established lucrative trade businesses.

Towards the end of the 16th and the beginning of the 17th century, the Jewish quarter, Mahalla, was established in the town of Bukhara. The Jews were forbidden to reside outside its boundaries.

During the 18th century, Bukharan Jews continued to face discrimination and persecution. Jewish centers were closed down, and the Muslims of the region forced conversion on a number of Jews, under a threat of torture and agonizing execution. Some were killed for refusing to convert. Jews who forcibly converted were known as Chalas, a term meaning "neither this nor that".

By the middle of the 18th century, practically all Bukharan Jews lived in the Bukharan Emirate. In the early 1860s, Arminius Vambery, a Hungarian-Jewish traveler, visited the emirate disguised as a Sunni dervish and noted in his journals that the Jews of Bukhara "live in utmost oppression, being despised by everyone."

=== Adoption of the Sephardic liturgy ===
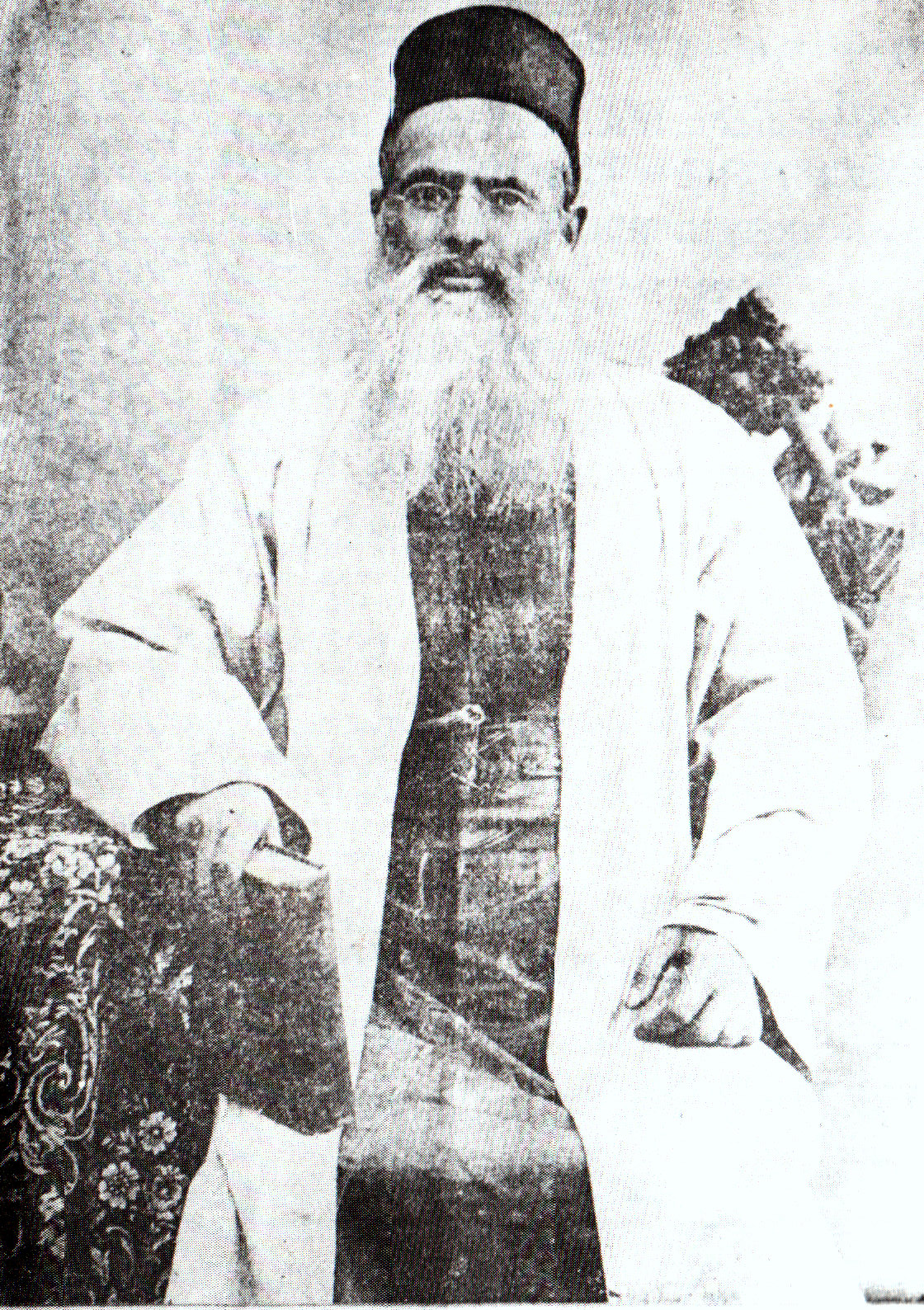
Rabbi Shimon Hakham, the great-grandson of Rabbi Yosef Maimon

In 1793, a missionary kabbalist named Rabbi Yosef Maimon, who was a Sephardic Jew originally from Tetuan, Morocco, travelled to Bukhara to collect/solicit money from Jewish patrons. It was during his search for funds that he chose to stay, in order to strengthen Judaism within the local Jewish population, who were said to be in a state of disarray.

Prior to Maimon's arrival, the native Jews of Bukhara followed the Persian religious tradition. Maimon staunchly demanded that the native Jews of Bukhara adopt Sephardic traditions. Many of the native Jews were opposed to this and the community split into two factions. The opposing faction was led by Rabbi Zacchariah ben Mashiah, who was originally from Sanaa, Yemen. The followers of the Maimon clan eventually won the struggle for religious authority over the native Bukharans, and Bukharan Jewry forcefully switched to Sephardi customs. The supporters of the Maimon clan, in the conflict, credit Maimon with causing a revival of Jewish practice among Bukharan Jews which they claim was in danger of dying out. However, there is evidence that there were Torah scholars present upon his arrival to Bukhara, but because they followed the Persian rite their practices were aggressively rejected as incorrect by Maimon.

Maimon's great-grandson Shimon Hakham continued his great-grandfather's work as a rabbi, and in 1870 opened the Talmid Hakham yeshiva in Bukhara, where religious law was promoted. At that time Bukharan Jews were getting only a general education, which mostly consisted of religious laws, reading, writing and some math. Even though they studied Torah, many Bukharan Jews did not speak fluent Hebrew. Only a few books were written in Persian and many of them were old and incomplete. Hakham decided to change this situation by translating religious books into Bukhori. However, since there was no printing in Bukhara at that time, he went to Jerusalem to print his books.

=== Under Imperial Russian rule ===
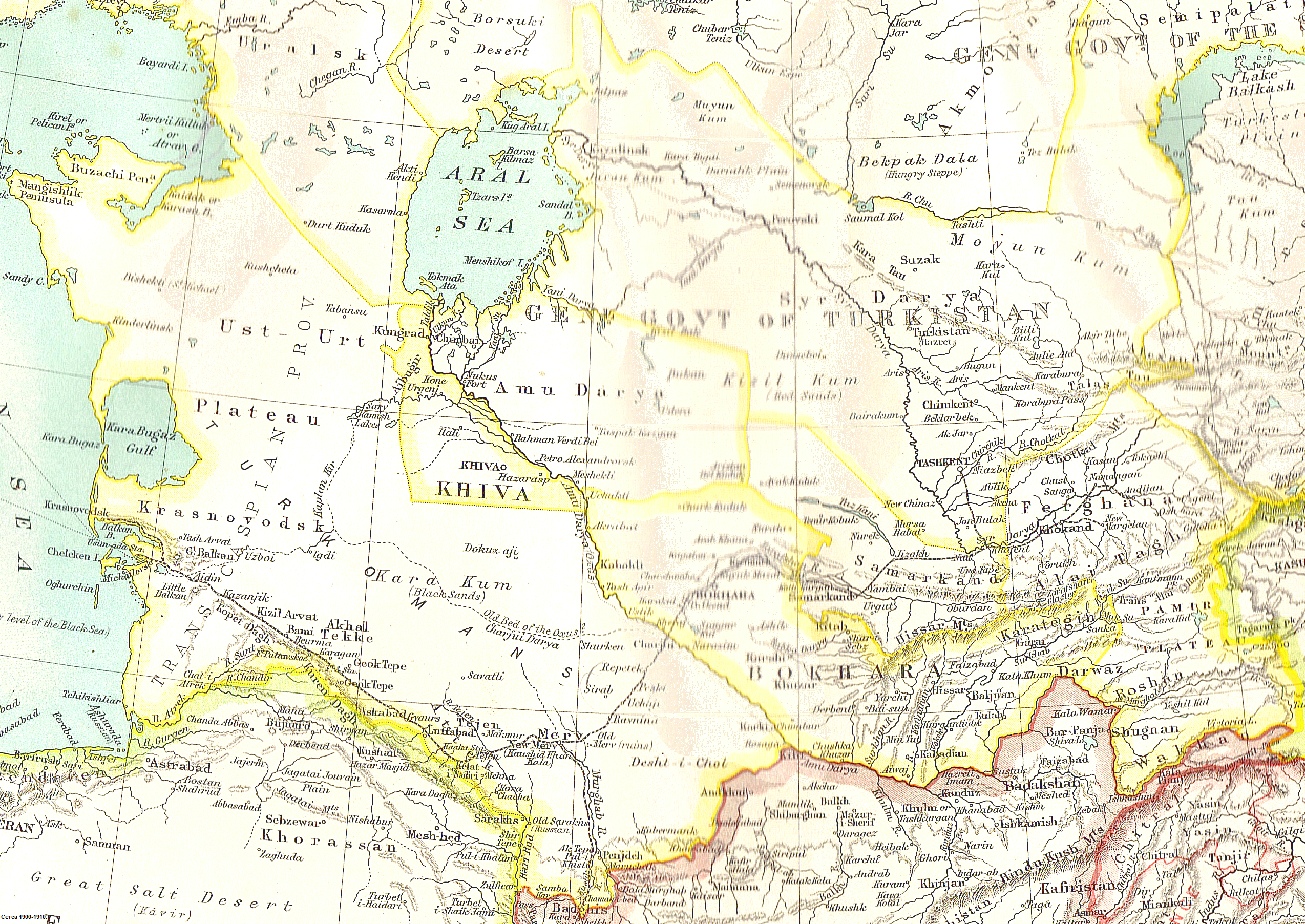
The Russian imperial territories of Khiva, Bukhara, and neighboring provinces in 1902–1903

In 1865, Russian colonial troops took over Tashkent and established the Russian Turkestan region as part of their expanding empire. Unlike the Jews of Eastern Europe, Tsarist Russia was largely favorable towards the Jews living there. This was due to years of trade relations with the Bukharan Jews, resulting in their being viewed as potential allies in the region and as interpreters with the local authorities. As a Russian official explained in 1866:

Whatever we know of the interior of Bukhara we are chiefly indebted for its Jewish inhabitants ... Upon the whole the Jews of Bukhara are much shrewder than their oppressive masters, and able to converse on subjects of which a genuine Bokharan has no idea.

In spring of 1868, Russian authorities relied on Jewish support when their armies attacked the Emirate of Bukhara as young Jewish men acted as scouts for the Russians and brought food and drinks to the Russian troops.

An 1884 report by Vasily Radlov described how the Bukharan Jews viewed Tsarist Russia rule:

The Jew, who in Europe has lived for centuries in enmity with the Christian, welcomes him here with a shining gaze ... and is delighted to be able to wave a greeting to him. He proudly regards him as his new friend, his protector. In his proximity, he looks down on the Mohammedan with contempt.

From 1876 to 1916, a period dubbed the "Golden Age" for Bukharan Jews, they were no longer restricted in their autonomy and had the same rights as their Muslim neighbors. Dozens of Bukharan Jews held prestigious jobs in medicine, law, and government, and many of them prospered. Many Bukharan Jews became successful and well-respected actors, artists, dancers, musicians, singers, film producers, and sportsmen. Several Bukharan entertainers became artists of merit and gained the title "People's Artist of Uzbekistan", "People's Artist of Tajikistan", and even (in the Soviet era) "People's Artist of the Soviet Union". Many succeeded in the world of sport, with several Bukharan Jews in Uzbekistan becoming renowned boxers and winning many medals for the country.

=== Hibbat Zion and immigration to Ottoman Palestine ===
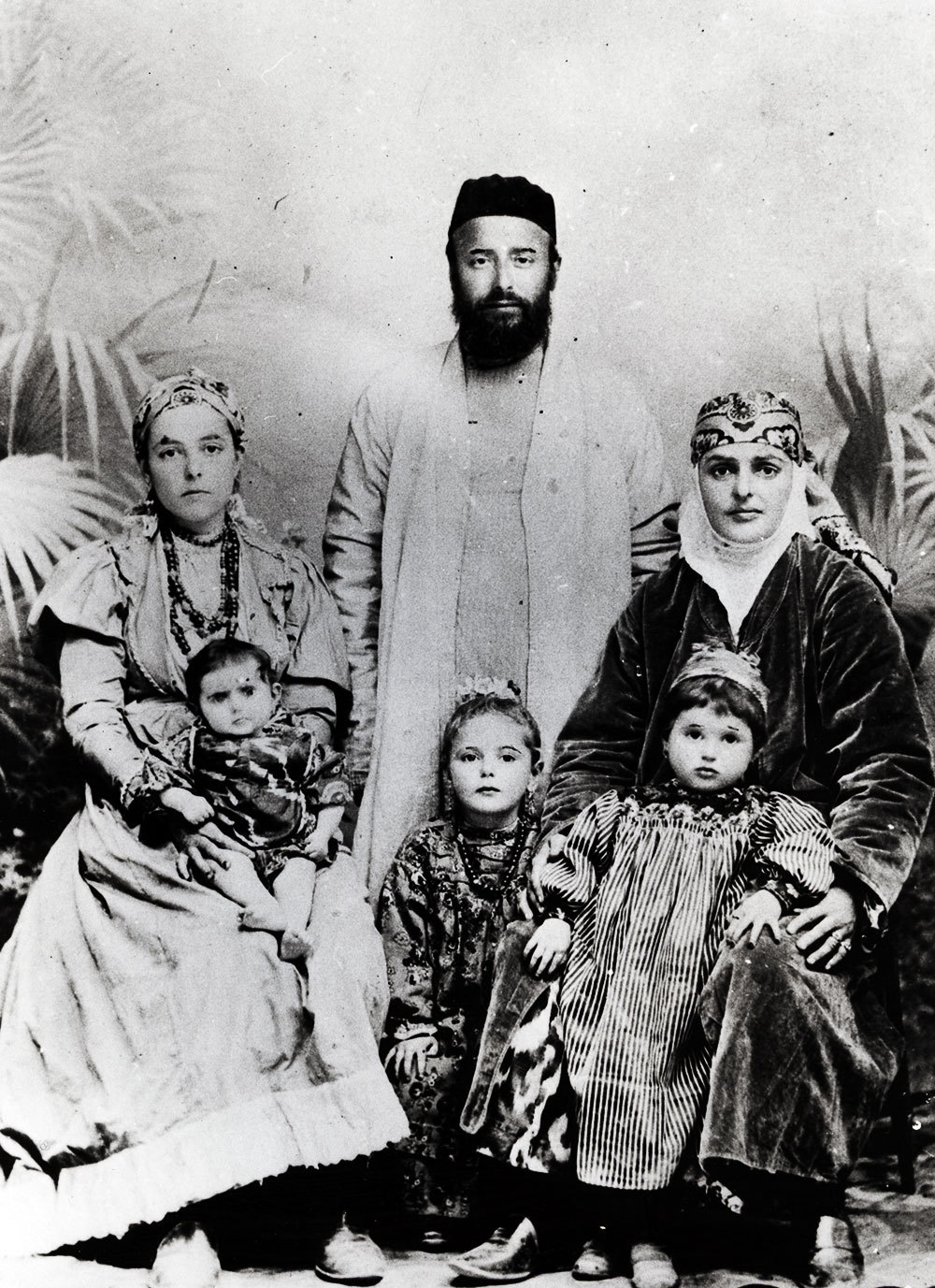
Bukharan Jewish family in Jerusalem, 1909

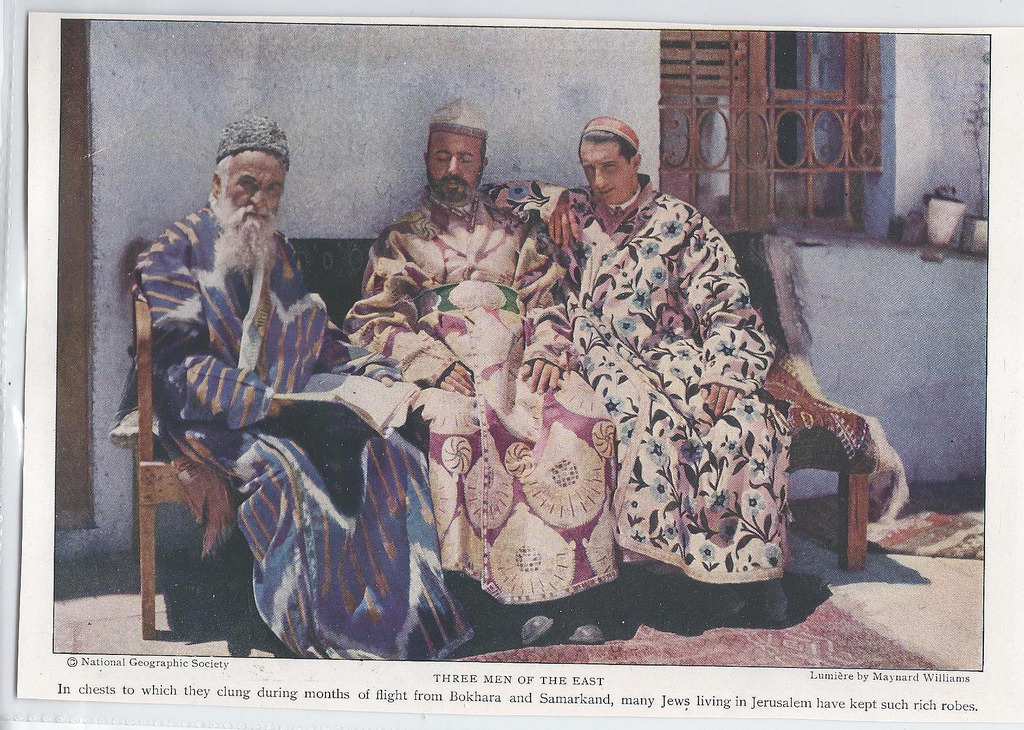
Bukharan Jewish men in Jerusalem, 1927

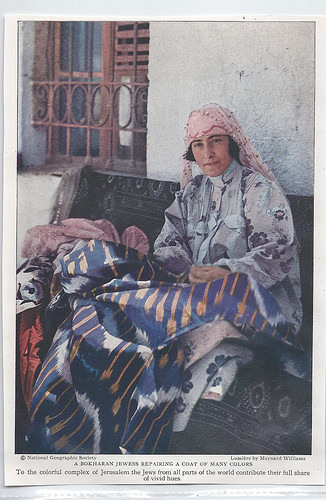
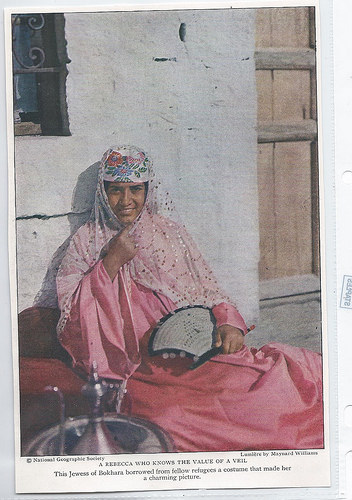
Bukharan Jewish women in Jerusalem, 1927

Beginning from 1872, Bukharan Jews began to move into the region of Ottoman Palestine, motivated by religious convictions and the desire to return to their ancestral homeland. The land on which they settled in Jerusalem was named the Bukharan Quarter (Sh'hunat HaBucharim) and still exists today. In 1890, seven members of the Bukharan Jewish community formed the Hovevei Zion Association of the Jewish communities of Bukhara, Samarkand and Tashkent. In 1891, the association bought land and drew up a charter stating that the new quarter would be built in the style of Europe's major cities. Architect Conrad Schick was employed to design the neighborhood. The streets were three times wider than even major thoroughfares in Jerusalem at the time, and spacious mansions were built with large courtyards. The homes were designed with neo-Gothic windows, European tiled roofs, neo-Moorish arches and Italian marble. Facades were decorated with Jewish motifs such as the Star of David and Hebrew inscriptions.

Rabbi Shimon Hakham and Rabbi Shlomo Moussaieff were some of the organizers of the quarter where Bukharan homes, synagogues, schools, libraries, and a bath house were established.

The Bukharan Quarter was one of the most affluent sections of the city, populated by Bukharan Jewish merchants and religious scholars supported primarily by various trading activities such as cotton, gemstones, and tea from Central Asia. Following World War I and the Bolshevik Revolution, the quarter fell into decline as sources of income from foreign trade became cut off leaving many residents with little more than just their homes in Jerusalem, forcing them to subdivide and rent out rooms to bring in income. From being lauded as one of the most beautiful neighborhoods in the city, the Bukharian Quarter earned the opposite sobriquet, of being one of the poorest neighborhoods of Jerusalem. In the 1920s and 1930s, the neighborhood also became one of the centers of the Zionist movement with many of its leaders and philosophers living there.

Between 1953 and 1963, Rabbi Bernard M. Casper was working as Dean for Student Affairs at the Hebrew University of Jerusalem, and during this period he became deeply concerned about the impoverished Quarter. After his appointment as Chief Rabbi in South Africa he set up a special fund for the Quarter's improvement and this was tied with Prime Minister Menachem Begin's urban revitalization program, Project Renewal. Johannesburg was twinned with the Bukharan Quarter, and Johannesburg Jewry raised enormous funds for its rehabilitation. Frustrated by the lack of progress, Casper traveled to Jerusalem in 1981 to resolve the hurdles. He consulted with community organizer Moshe Kahan and suggested that they present the dormant agencies with concrete evidence of what could be done. Using a private discretionary fund, he initiated development of several pilot projects, among them a free loan fund, a dental clinic and a hearing center whose successes spurred the municipality back on track.

The quarter borders Tel Arza on the west, the Shmuel HaNavi neighborhood on the north, Arzei HaBira on the east, and Geula on the south. Today, most of the residents are Haredi Jews.

=== Under Soviet rule ===
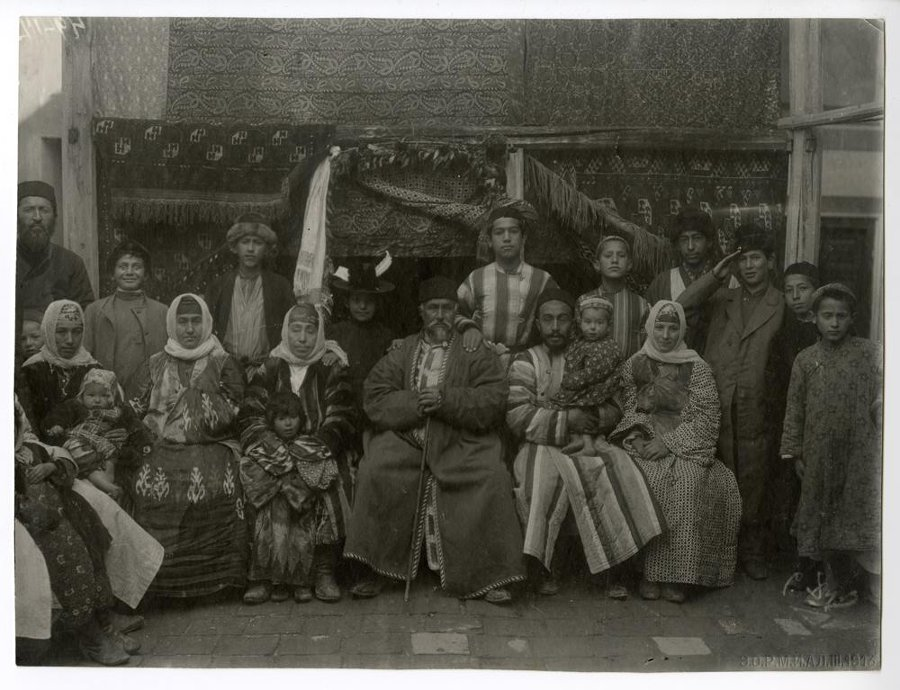
Family of David Kalontarov, head of Samarkand's Bukharan Quarter, in front of their Sukkah, 1902

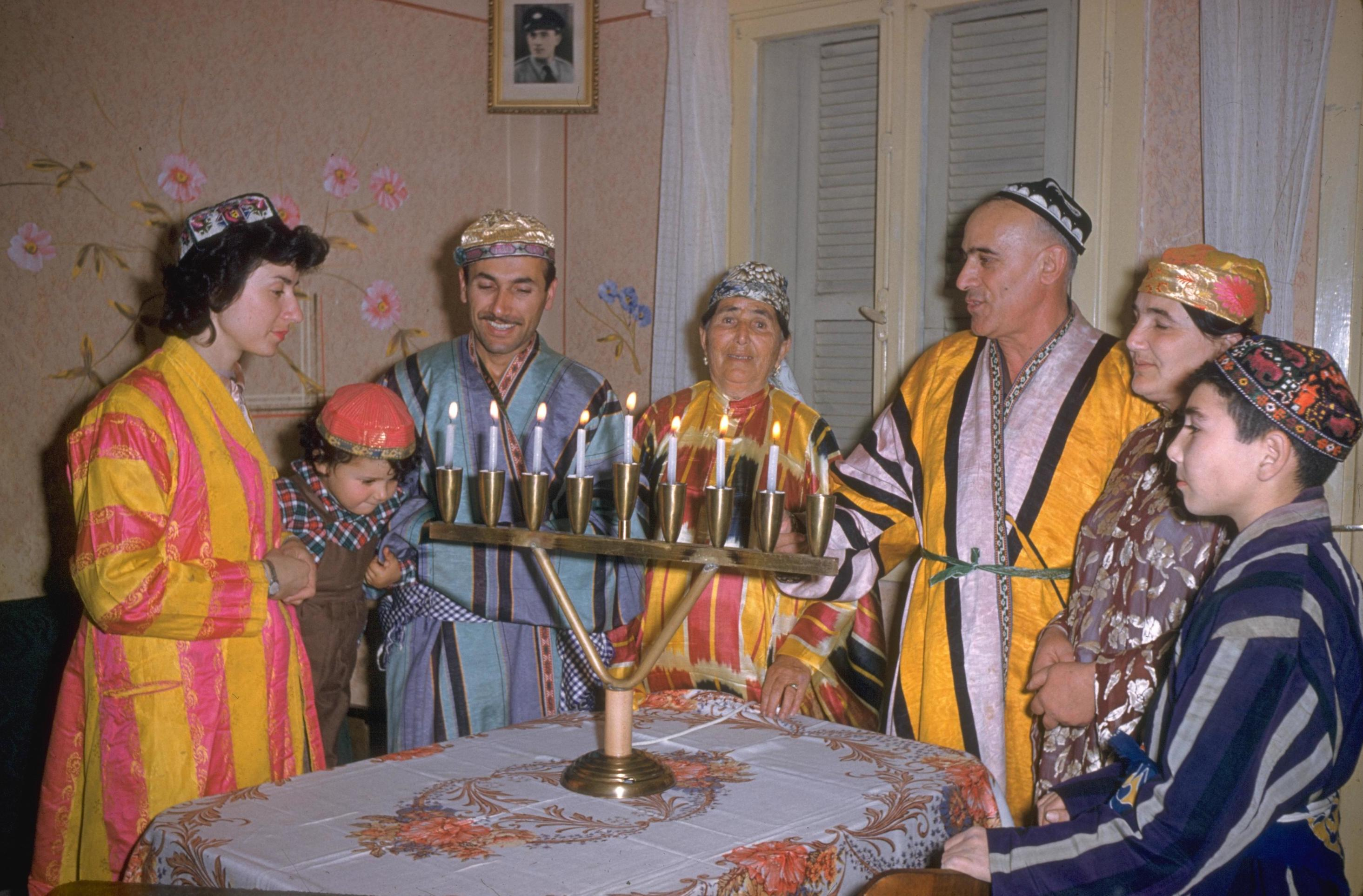
Bukharan Jewish family celebrate Hanukkah in Tel Aviv, 1959

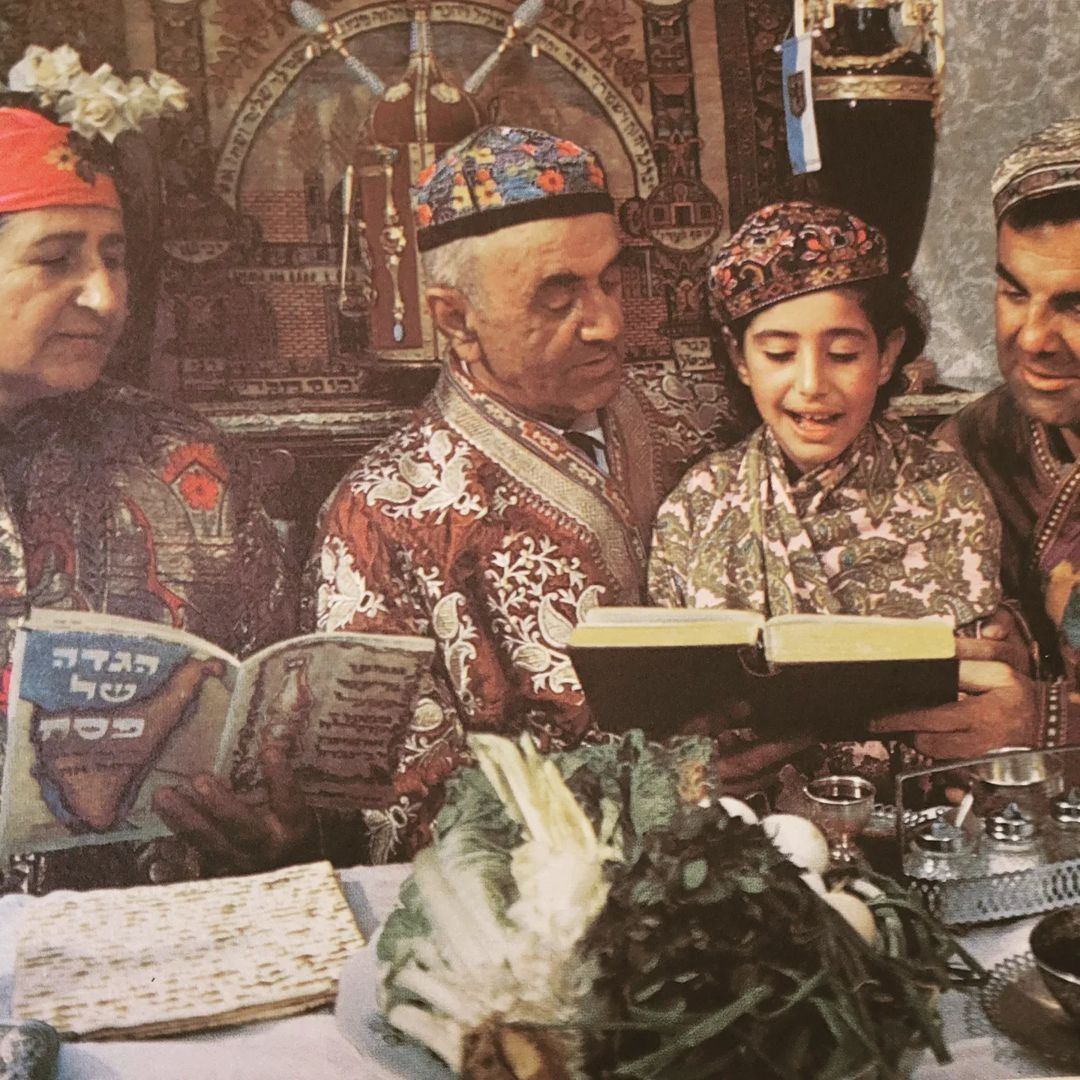
Bukharan Jewish family celebrate Passover in Jerusalem, c. 1970s

Following the Soviet capture of Bukhara and the creation of the Soviet Socialist Republics of Uzbekistan and Tajikistan, synagogues were destroyed or closed down, and were replaced by Soviet institutions. As a result, many Bukharan Jews fled to the West.

Stalin's decision to end Lenin's New Economic Policy and initiate the First five-year plan in the late 1920s resulted in a drastic deterioration of living conditions for the Bukharan Jews. By the time Soviet authorities established their hold over the borders in Central Asia in the mid 1930s, many tens of thousands of households from Central Asia had crossed the border into Iran and Afghanistan, amongst them some 4,000 Bukharan Jews who were heading towards Mandatory Palestine.

Soviet doctrines, ideology and nationalities policy had a large impact on the everyday life, culture and identity of the Bukharan Jews.

Bukharan Jews who had put efforts into creating a Bukharan Jewish Soviet culture and national identity were charged during Stalin's Great Purge or, as part of the Soviet Union's nationalities policies and nation building campaigns, were forced to assimilate into the larger Soviet Uzbek or Soviet Tajik national identities. Nevertheless, the community still attempted to preserve their traditions while displaying loyalty to the new government.

During this time, both Jews and Muslims suffered from the anti-religious policies the Soviets imposed on Central Asia, which aimed to break the power of their religious institutions and eventually replace religious belief with atheism.

In 1950, the "Black Years of Soviet Jewry" began when suppression of the Jewish religion resumed after having paused due to World War II. After Joseph Stalin's attempt to turn the newly founded state of Israel into a socialist country failed, an anti-Israel, anti-Zionist, and antisemitic campaign launched against Soviet Jews. Several religious and prominent Bukharan Jews were arrested and sentenced to 25 years on charges of "Zionist propagation". Even those who uttered the traditional phrase said by Jews on the Passover holiday, "Next Year in Jerusalem", were subject to arrests. These arrests were all part of the Soviet anti-cosmopolitan campaign, where antisemitism was often disguised under the banner of anti-Zionism.

After the creation of the state of Israel in 1948, and later the Six-Day Arab–Israeli War of 1967, antisemitism intensified amongst the Muslim majority, with the 1967 war leading to a rise in Jewish patriotism. The Soviet Union forbade Jews to make aliyah to Israel though these restrictions loosened in the 1970s and ceased in the 1980s.

=== Relationship with other Jewish communities ===
After the Russian conquest of Central Asia, a small number of Ashkenazi Jews emigrated from Eastern Europe and the European part of the Russian Empire to Russian Turkestan. During World War II, tens of thousands of Ashkenazi Jews from the European regions of the Soviet Union headed eastward to various Soviet republics in Central Asia, either as refugees, or were forcefully deported there by Joseph Stalin. In Soviet Uzbekistan, the Bukharan Jewish communities helped contribute to the resettlement of these refugees, housing families in their homes and assisted them with finding jobs until they settled in to their new surroundings.

Despite this, Bukharan and Ashkenazi Jews largely remained separate from one another, and intermarriage between the two was extremely rare. Bukharan Jews ranged from religious to traditional, and clustered together (particular those who lived in the Jewish Quarters), while most Ashkenazi Jews living in Central Asia were secular, both structurally and culturally, and assimilated into the general populace. Some Bukharan Jews viewed Ashkenazi Jews as inauthentic Jews, and looked down on them for their lack of Jewish identity. Both groups are also buried in separate cemeteries.

However, Bukharan Jewry had good relations with the Chabad-Lubavitch, beginning from the end of the 19th century with the arrival of Rabbi Shlomo Leib Eliezrov, a student of Rabbi Sholom Dovber Schneersohn. Rabbi Eliezrov accepted a temporary rabbinical position in Uzbekistan and helped organize the provision of kosher meat in surrounding cities where Jews lived. Over the decades, other emissaries from Chabad would come to support the community as well.

=== Mass migration after 1991 ===
In the late 1980s to the late 1990s, following the collapse of the Soviet Union and foundation of the independent Republic of Uzbekistan in 1991, most of the remaining Bukharan Jews left Central Asia for the United States, Israel, Europe, or Australia in the last mass emigration of Bukharan Jews from their resident lands.

Some left due to economic instability, while others left fearing growth of nationalistic policies in the country. The resurgence of Islamic fundamentalism in Uzbekistan and Tajikistan (such as the Fergana massacre and the 1990 Dushanbe riots) prompted an increase in the level of Jewish emigration. According to various Bukharan Jews, the Uzbek and Tajik locals would come to Jewish homes and say things in line with "Go back to where you came from. You don't belong here." Because of this, Jewish citizens also found it difficult to sell their homes at a reasonable price. In 1990, there were riots against the Jewish population of Andijan and nearby areas. This led to most Jews in the Fergana Valley immigrating to Israel or the United States.

== Immigrant populations ==
=== Tajikistan ===
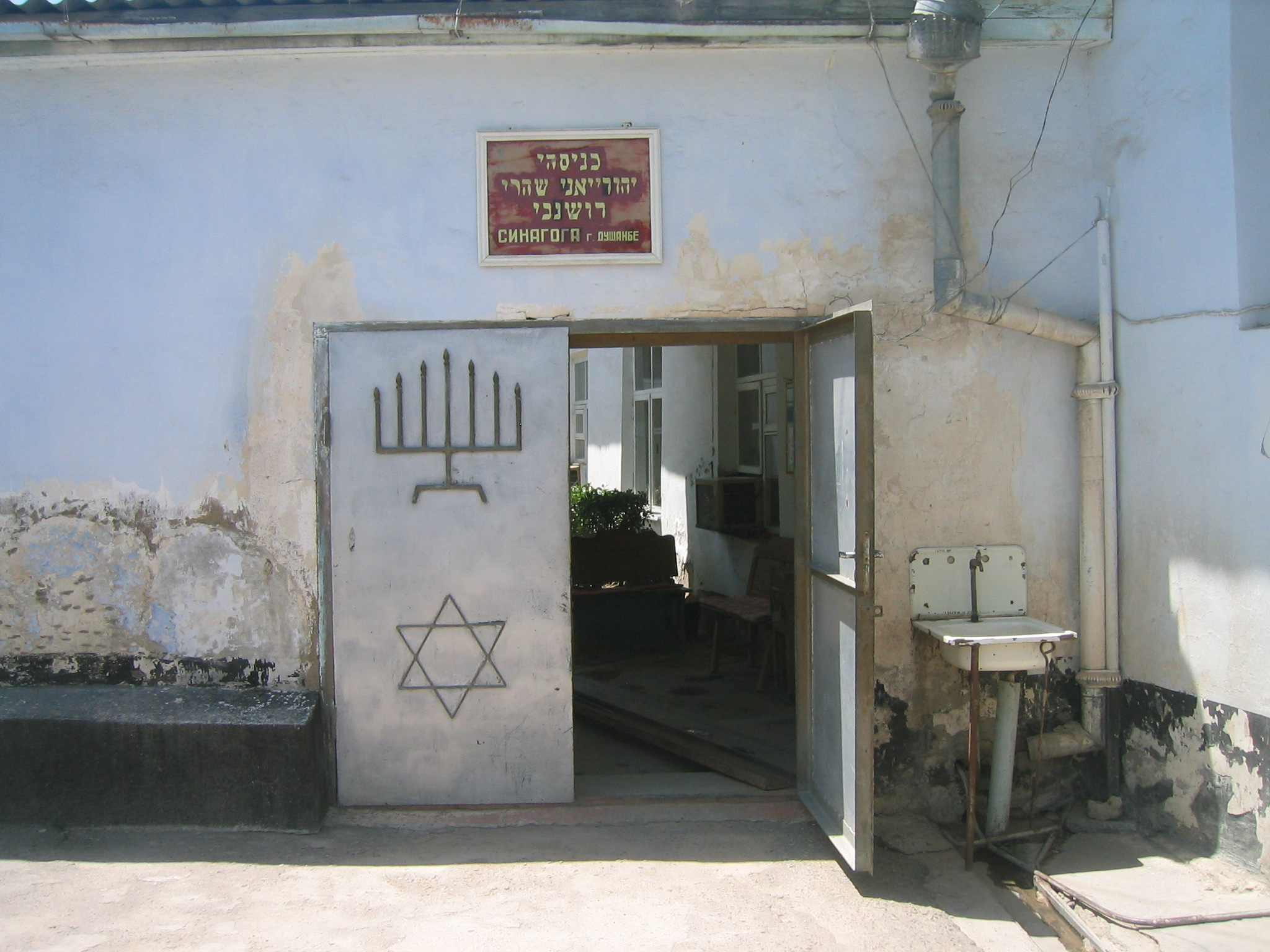
Entrance to the now-demolished Dushanbe Synagogue in 2006

In early 2006, the still active Dushanbe Synagogue in Tajikistan as well as the city's mikveh (ritual bath), kosher butcher, and Jewish schools were demolished by the government (without compensation to the community) to make room for the new Palace of Nations. After an international outcry, the government of Tajikistan announced a reversal of its decision and publicly claimed that it would permit the synagogue to be rebuilt on its current site. However, in mid-2008, the government of Tajikistan destroyed the whole synagogue and started construction of the Palace of Nations. The Dushanbe synagogue was Tajikistan's only synagogue, and the community were therefore left without a center or a place to pray. In 2009, the Tajik government reestablished the synagogue in a different location for the small Jewish community.

As of the 2010 census, there are 36 Jews left in Tajikistan. Two are Bukharan Jews while the other 34 are Ashkenazi. On January 15, 2021, Jura Abaev, the last Jew in the city of Khujand, Tajikistan, died.

=== Afghanistan ===
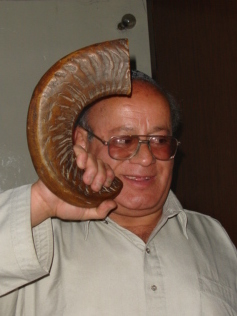
Zablon Simintov, known as the last Jew of Afghanistan

As Afghanistan is a landlocked country located between Central Asia and South Asia, the Jews who lived in Afghanistan are sometimes considered to be the same as Bukharan Jews though some Jews from Afghanistan identify solely as "Afghan Jews".

With the Kazakh famine of 1930–1933, a significant number of Bukharan Jews crossed the border into the Kingdom of Afghanistan as part of the wider famine-related refugee crisis; leaders of the communities petitioned Jewish communities in Europe and the United States for support. In total, some 60,000 refugees had fled from the Soviet Union and reached Afghanistan.

In 1935, the Jewish Telegraphic Agency reported that "ghetto rules" had been imposed on Afghan Jews, requiring them to wear particular clothes, requiring Jewish women to stay outside markets, requiring all Jews to live within certain distances from mosques and banning Jews from riding horses. In 1935, a delegate to the World Zionist Congress claimed that an estimated 40,000 Bukharan Jews had been killed or starved to death.

Due to decades of warfare, antisemitism, and religious persecution, Afghanistan's Jewish population continued to dwindle as many emigrated to other countries. By the end of 2004, only two known Jews were left in Afghanistan, Zablon Simintov and Isaac Levy (born c. 1920). Levy relied on charity to survive while Simintov ran a store selling carpets and jewelry until 2001. They lived on opposite sides of the dilapidated Kabul synagogue. In January 2005, Levy died of natural causes, leaving Simintov as the sole known Jew in Afghanistan.

In 2021, Simintov left Afghanistan amidst the Taliban takeover, and there are officially no Jews remaining in Afghanistan today.

=== United States ===
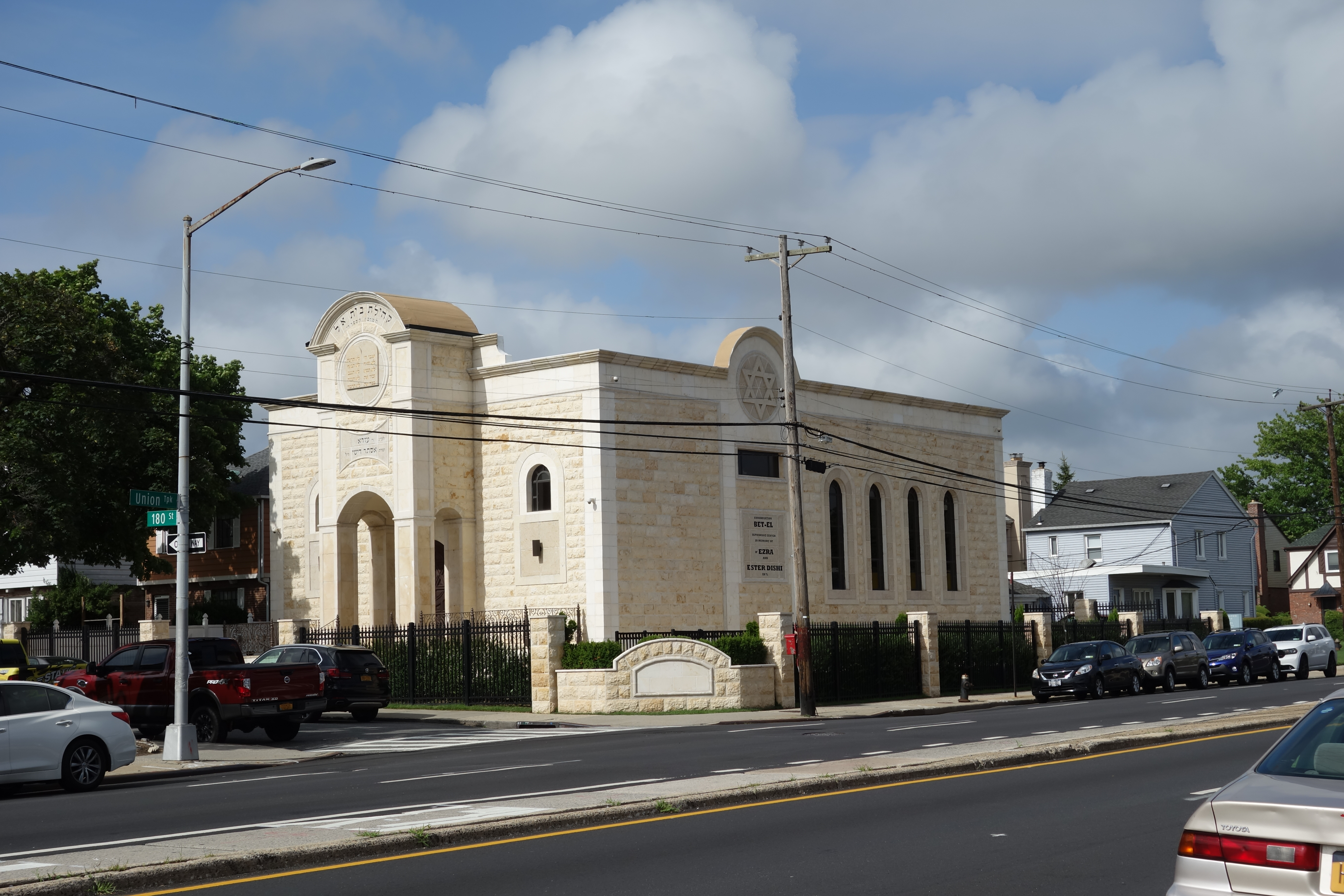
Congregation Beth-El in Fresh Meadows, Queens, a Bukharan synagogue

The largest number of Bukharan Jews in the U.S. is in New York City. In Forest Hills, Queens, 108th Street, often referred to as "Bukharan Broadway" or "Bukharian Broadway", is filled with Bukharan restaurants and gift shops. Furthermore, the street is nicknamed "Bukharlem" due to the majority of the population being Bukharan. They have formed a tight-knit enclave in this area that was once primarily inhabited by Ashkenazi Jews. Congregation Tifereth Israel in Corona, Queens, a synagogue founded in the early 1900s by Ashkenazi Jews, became Bukharan in the 1990s. Kew Gardens, Queens, also has a very large population of Bukharan Jews. Although Bukharan Jews in Queens remain insular in some ways (living in close proximity to each other, owning and patronizing clusters of stores, and attending their own synagogue rather than other synagogues in the area), they have connections with non-Bukharans in the area. In December 1999, the First Congress of the Bukharian Jews of the United States and Canada convened in Queens. In 2007, Bukharan-American Jews initiated lobbying efforts on behalf of their community. Zoya Maksumova, president of the Bukharan women's organization "Esther Hamalka" said "This event represents a huge leap forward for our community. Now, for the first time, Americans will know who we are." During a speech, Senator Joseph Lieberman stated, "God said to Abraham, 'You'll be an eternal people' ... and now we see that the State of Israel lives, and this historic [Bukharan] community, which was cut off from the Jewish world for centuries in Central Asia and suffered oppression during the Soviet Union, is alive and well in America. God has kept his promise to the Jewish people."

== Culture ==
=== Dress codes ===
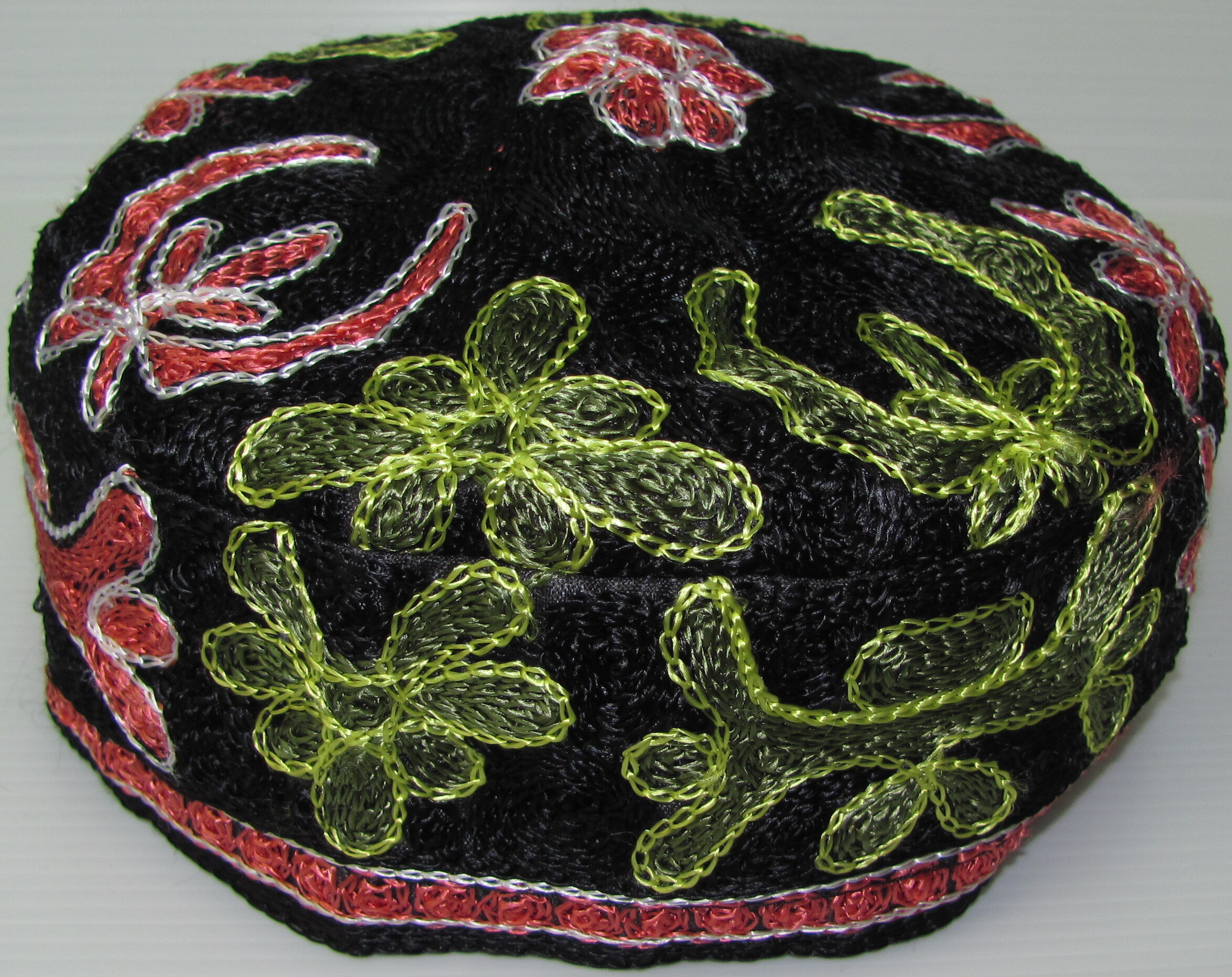
Bukharan kippah

Bukharan Jews had their own dress code, similar to but also different from other cultures (mainly Turco-Mongol) living in Central Asia, which they wore as their daily attire until the Soviet Union, though was still worn during communal events. Today, the traditional kaftan (Jomah-ҷома-ג'אמה in Bukhori and Tajik) is worn during weddings and Bar Mitzvahs.

Bukharan Jews also have a unique kippah, a full head-sized covering with rich patterns and lively colors embroidered. In present times, this kippah can sometimes be seen being worn by liberal-leaning and Reform Jews.

=== Music ===
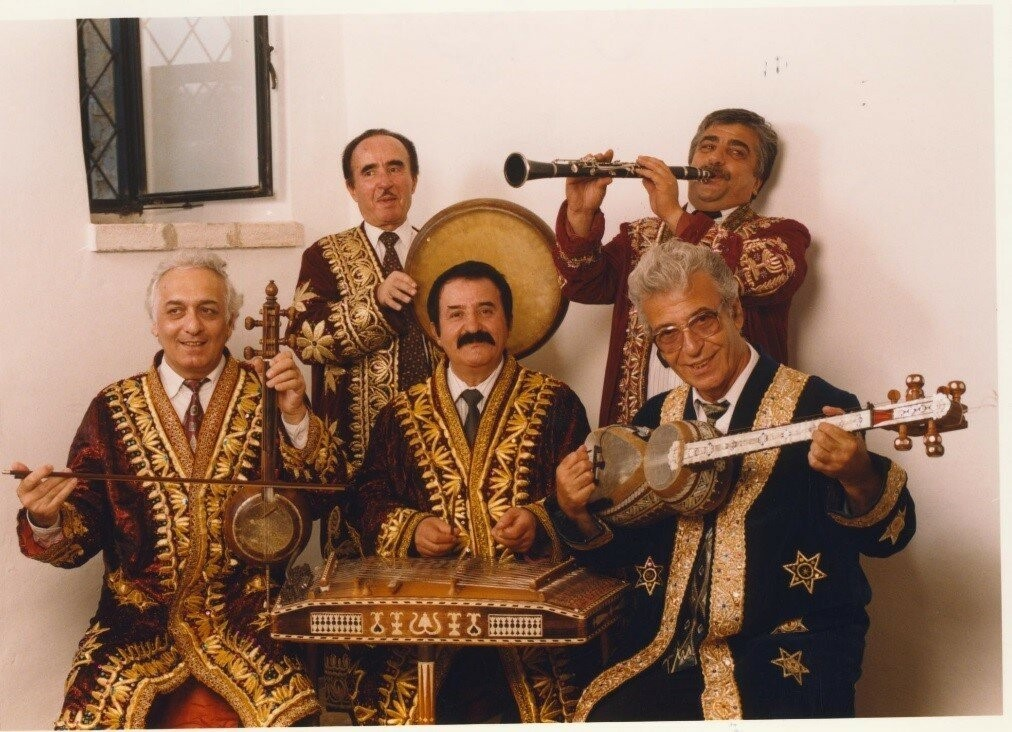
Jewish ensemble in Bukhara, 1987

The Bukharan Jews have a distinct musical tradition called shashmaqam, which is an ensemble of stringed instruments, infused with Central Asian rhythms, and a considerable klezmer influence as well as Muslim melodies, and even Spanish chords. The main instrument is the dayereh. Shashmaqam music "reflect[s] the mix of Hassidic vocals, Indian and Islamic instrumentals and Sufi-inspired texts and lyrical melodies." They were heavily responsible for sustaining and transmitting the music during the Soviet era, and later when immigrating to the United States. Ensemble Shashmaqam was one of the first New York-based ensembles created to showcase the music and dance of Bukharan Jews.

An account from explorer Henry Lansdell in 1885, upon visiting Samarkand and hearing the music of the Bukharan Jews:

We went then to the synagogue, allowed to the Jews of Samarkand only since the Russians came, where the best chorister in the region was that evening to sing. The crowd was dense, and in a short time two singers appeared; the "primo," a delicate, modest-looking man, who blushed at the eagerness with which his arrival was awaited, whilst the "secondo" was a brazen-faced fellow, who carried his head on one side, as if courting attention, and with the assurance that he should have it. They were introduced to us, and began at once, that we might hear. The singing, so called, was the most remarkable that up to that time I had ever heard. The first voice led off in a key so high, that he had to strain for some seconds before he could utter a sound at all. After this he proceeded very slowly as to the number of words he sang, but prolonged his notes into numerous flourishes, screaming as loud as he could in falsetto. The second voice was an accompaniment for the first; but as both bawled as loudly as possible, I soon voted it anything but good music, and intimated that it was time for us to go. The congregation, moreover, were crowding round, without the smallest semblance of their being engaged in divine worship.

=== Weddings and marriage traditions ===
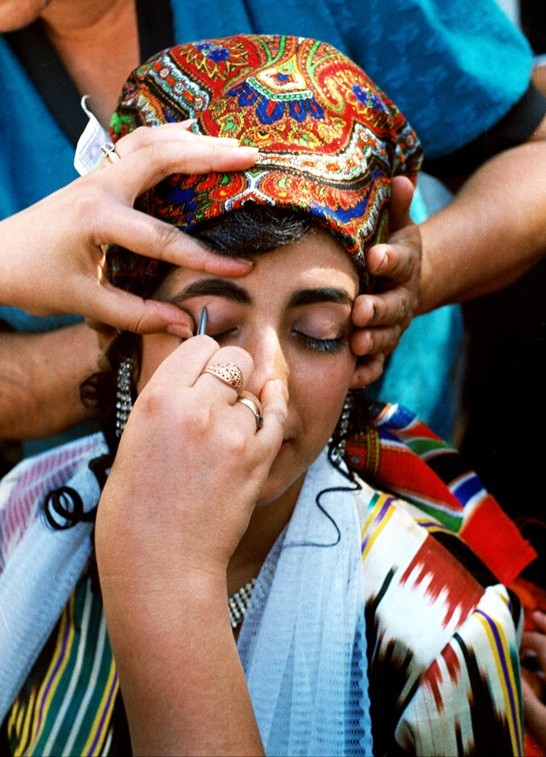
Jewish bride at a Kosh-Chinon ceremony in Bukhara, 1999

Bukharan Jews celebrated their weddings in several stages leading up to the wedding ceremony. When a match between a couple was accepted, an engagement (Shirini-Khori) took place in the house of the bride. Following this, the Rabbi congratulated the father of the bride on the engagement and distributed sugar to those present. Other sweets were distributed towards relatives, notifying them that the engagement had taken place. After engagement, the meeting between parents of the groom and bride was carried out in the house of the bride, where refreshments and gifts from the groom were sent. Further celebrations lasted a week in the house of the groom, where relatives of the groom brought gifts to the bride.

Before the wedding, a unique practice that was done was a Kosh-Chinon ceremony, a local custom practiced by both Jews and Muslims in Central Asia, which involved all the female guests of the wedding to pluck the bride's eyebrows and the strands of hair above her lip, as well as the sides of the bride's face being cleaned of their dark wisps. Girls in Central Asia were taught that they should not manicure their facial hair until they got married. The smooth, clean face served as a mark of womanhood. This ceremony was done a few days before the wedding, and after the bride had immersed herself in the Mikveh.

The wedding itself followed the same traditions as a standard Jewish wedding, including the signing of the Ketubah, the Chuppah, and the Kiddish. A few small differences were the Chuppah being a prayer shawl that was held by members of the family, unlike it being hung on four poles as is widely practiced today in Jewish weddings. Furthermore, as the bride and groom would take their positions in the prayer shawl, the mothers of the bride and groom would stitch their needles through the fabric of their children's clothing.

=== Cuisine ===
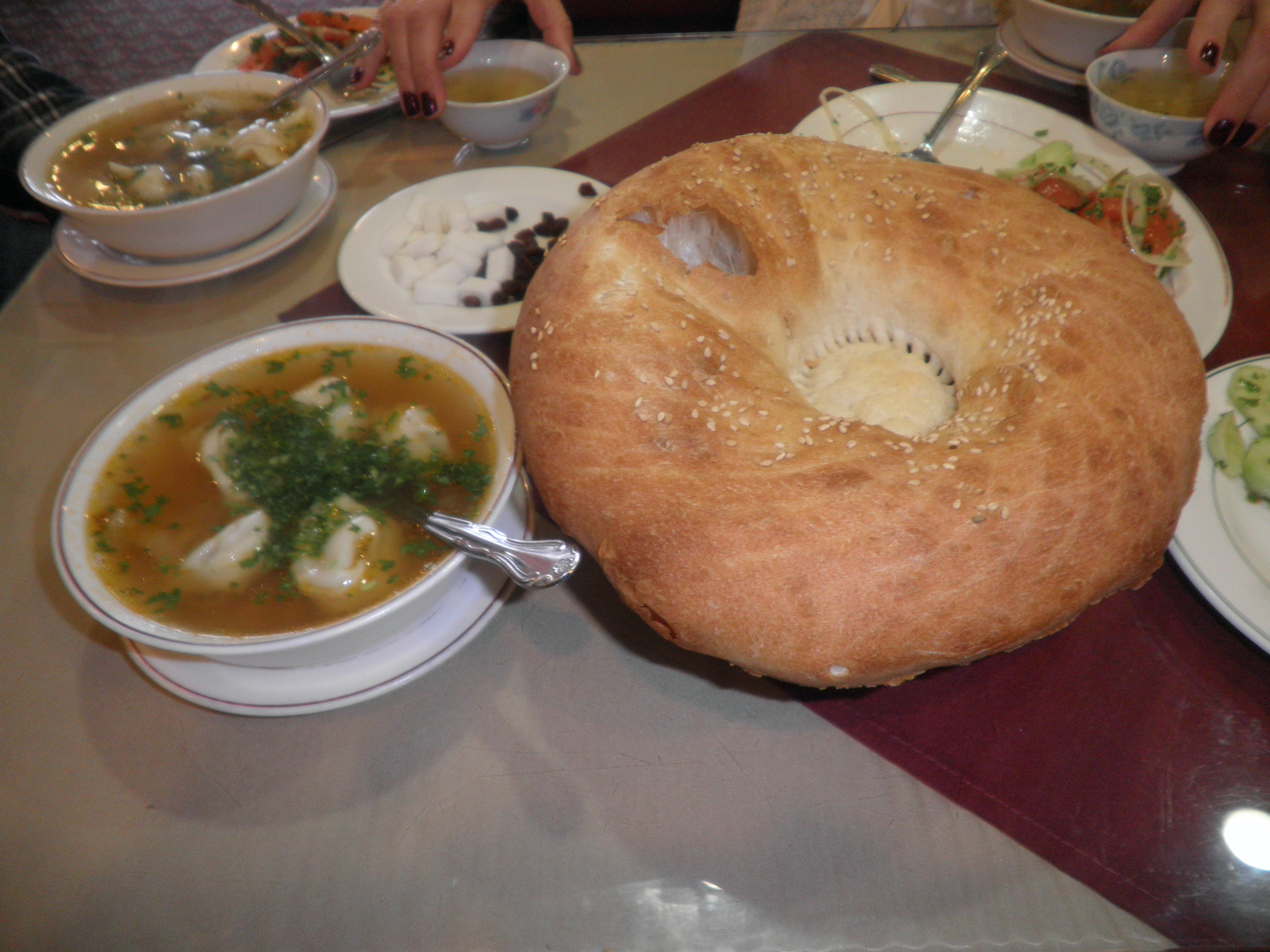
Central Asian style dumpling soup called shurboi dushpera or tushpera (left) along with traditional tandoor style bread called non in Bukharan, Tajik, and Uzbek (right)

The cooking of Bukharan Jews is based on traditional Central Asian cuisine, along with some uniquely Bukharan Jewish dishes such as bakhsh and osh savo, subject to the restrictions of Jewish dietary laws.

The Bukharians' Jewish identity was always preserved in the kitchen. "Even though we were in exile from Jerusalem, we observed kashruth," said Isak Masturov, another owner of Cheburechnaya. "We could not go to restaurants, so we had to learn to cook for our own community."

Authentic Bukharan Jewish dishes include:

- Osh palov – a Bukharan Jewish version of palov for weekdays, includes both beef and chicken.
- Bakhsh – "green palov", rice with meat or chicken and green herbs (coriander, parsley, dill), exists in two varieties; bakhshi khaltagi cooked Jewish-style in a small bag immersed in a pot with boiling water or soup and bakhshi degi cooked like regular palov in a cauldron; bakhshi khaltagi is precooked and therefore can be served on Shabbat.
- Oshi sabo (also osh savo or osovoh), a "meal in a pot" slowly cooked overnight and eaten hot for Shabbat lunch. Oshi sabo is made with meat, rice, vegetables, and fruit added for a unique sweet and sour taste. By virtue of its culinary function (a hot Shabbat meal in Jewish homes) and ingredients (rice, meat, vegetables cooked together overnight), oshi sabo is a Bukharan version of cholent or hamin.
- Khalta savo – food cooked in a bag (usually rice and meat, possibly with the addition of dried fruit).
- Yakhni – a dish consisting of two kinds of boiled meat (beef and chicken), brought whole to the table and sliced before serving with a little broth and a garnish of boiled vegetables; a main course for Friday night dinner.
- Kov roghan – fried pieces of chicken with fried potatoes piled on top.
- Serkaniz (Sirkoniz) – garlic rice dish, another variation of palov.
- Oshi piyozi – stuffed onion.
- Shulah – a Bukharan-style risotto.
- Boyjon – eggplant puree mixed only with salt and garlic, the traditional starter for the Friday-night meal in Bukharan Jewish homes.
- Slotah Bukhori – a salad made with tomato, cucumber, green onion, cilantro, salt, pepper, and lemon juice. Some also put in lettuce and chili pepper.
- Bichak – stuffed baked or fried pastry, traditional for Rosh Hashanah and Sukkot.
- Samsa – pastries filled with spiced meat or vegetables, are baked in a unique, hollowed out tandoor oven, and greatly resemble the preparation and shape of Indian samosas.
- Noni Toki – a crispy flat bread that is baked on the back of a wok. This method creates a bowl-shaped bread.
- Fried fish with garlic sauce (for Friday night dinner): "Every Bukharian Sabbath ... is greeted with a dish of fried fish covered with a pounded sauce of garlic and cilantro". In the Bukharan dialect, the dish is called mai birion or in full mai birion ovi sir, where mai birion is fried fish and ovi sir is garlic sauce (literally "garlic water"). Bread is sometimes fried and then dipped in the remaining garlic water and is called noni-sir.
- Chakchak, a popular sweet made from unleavened dough cut and rolled into hazelnut-sized balls, which are then deep-fried in oil. Optionally, hazelnuts or dried fruit (e.g. apricots and raisins) are added to the mixture. The fried balls are stacked in a mound in a special mold and drenched with hot honey.

== Genetics ==
In autosomal analyses, Bukharan Jews form a close genetic cluster with Iranian Jews, Iraqi Jews, Mountain Jews, Georgian Jews, and Kurdish Jews, and are genetically completely distinct to their local neighbors. This cluster plots between Levantine and Northern West Asian populations.

Among non-Jewish populations, Bukharan Jews also form a cluster with other West Asian people including Kurds, Iranians, Armenians, Assyrians, and Levantine Arabs.

Research on the Y chromosomes of Bukharan Jews similarly shows their West Asian ancestry, and some Bukharan Jewish men belong to the Extended Cohen Modal Haplotype.

== Notable Bukharan Jews ==
=== Israel ===
- Assi Azar, television host and screenwriter
- Yisrael Aharoni, celebrity chef and restaurateur
- Mordekhai Batchaev, poet and radio broadcaster
- Avi Benedi, singer and songwriter
- Yoni Ben-Menachem, journalist, General Director of Israel Broadcasting Authority
- Amnon Cohen, politician, member of the Knesset for Shas
- Oded Davidoff, film and TV director
- Guy Haimov, professional football player
- Shimon Hakham, Bukharan rabbi, writer, one of the founders of the Bukharan Quarter
- Robert Ilatov, politician, member of the Knesset for Yisrael Beiteinu
- Avi Issacharoff, journalist and creator of the series Fauda
- Lev Leviev, billionaire businessman, investor, philanthropist, president of the World Congress of Bukharian Jews
- Nitzan Kaikov, songwriter and music producer
- Rinat Matatov, actress
- Moshe Mishaelof, professional football player
- Shlomo Moussaieff, co-founder of the Bukharan Quarter in Jerusalem
- Shlomo Moussaieff, businessman
- Dorrit Moussaieff, former First Lady of Iceland
- Rafael Pinhasi, politician; member of the Knesset for Shas
- Albert Pinhasov, researcher; Rector of Ariel University
- Gideon Sa'ar, politician who served as a member of Knesset for New Hope
- Yulia Shamalov-Berkovich, politician who served as a member of the Knesset for Kadima
- Esther Roth-Shahamorov, national athlete
- Idan Yaniv, singer, "2007 Israeli Artist of the Year"
- Benjamin Yusupov, classical composer, conductor and pianist

=== United States ===
- Jacob Arabo, proprietor of Jacob & Co.
- Michael Aronov, actor and playwright, Tony Award winner
- Boris Kandov, president of the Bukharian Jewish Congress of the US and Canada
- Jeffrey Moussaieff Masson, author
- Jacob Nasirov, Bukharan-American rabbi from Afghanistan (member of the Bukharian Rabbinical Counsel)
- Greg Yuna, jeweler
- Rus Yusupov, Internet entrepreneur; co-founder of Vine
- Iosef Yusupov, designer

=== United Kingdom ===
- Yvonne Green (née Mammon), poet and translator
- Jeremy Issacharoff, diplomat and ambassador for Israel
- Anthony Yadgaroff, businessman, Jewish community leader

=== Others ===
- Assaf Atchildi, doctor and surgeon. He is credited for saving over 300 Jews in Nazi-occupied France.
- Alexandre Reza, jeweler known for his diverse and rare collection of precious gemstones
- Ari Babakhanov, musician from Uzbekistan
- Eson Kandov, singer, Honored People's Artist of the USSR
- Rena Galibova, Soviet actress, "People's Artist of Tajikistan" (an awarded title, alluding to national prominence)
- Meirkhaim Gavrielov, journalist murdered in Tajikistan in 1998
- Barno Itzhakova, vocalist, famous for her rendition of traditional Shashmaqom songs in Tajik and Uzbek
- Malika Kalontarova, dancer, "People's Artist of Soviet Union" (Queen of Eastern Dance)
- Fatima Kuinova, Soviet singer, "Merited Artist of the Soviet Union"
- Ilyas Malayev, musician and poet from Uzbekistan, "Honoured Artist of Uzbekistan"
- Shoista Mullodzhanova, Shashmakon singer, "People's Artist of Tajikistan" (Queen of Shashmakom music)
- Gavriel Mullokandov, popular Shashmakom artist, "People's Artist of Uzbekistan"
- Suleiman Yudakov, Soviet composer and musician, "People's Artist of the Uzbek SSR"
- Yakhiel Sabzanov, Soviet composer, "People's Artist of the Tajik SSR"
- Zablon Simintov, widely regarded as the last remaining Jew in Afghanistan, evacuated to Israel in 2021

== See also ==
- Bukharan Jews in Israel
- Bukhori dialect
- Africa Israel Investments
- Dushanbe Synagogue
- Emirate of Bukhara
- History of the Jews in Russia and the Soviet Union
- History of the Jews under Muslim Rule
- Islamic–Jewish relations
- Antisemitism in Islam
- Ohr Avner Foundation

== Bibliography ==
- Ricardo Garcia-Carcel: La Inquisición, Biblioteca El Sol. Biblioteca Básica de Historia. Grupo Anaya, Madrid, Spain 1990. ISBN 84-7969-011-9.
