= Barno Itzhakova =

Bukharian Jewish musician from Tajikistan (1927-2001)

Barno Iskhakova ברנו יצחקובה
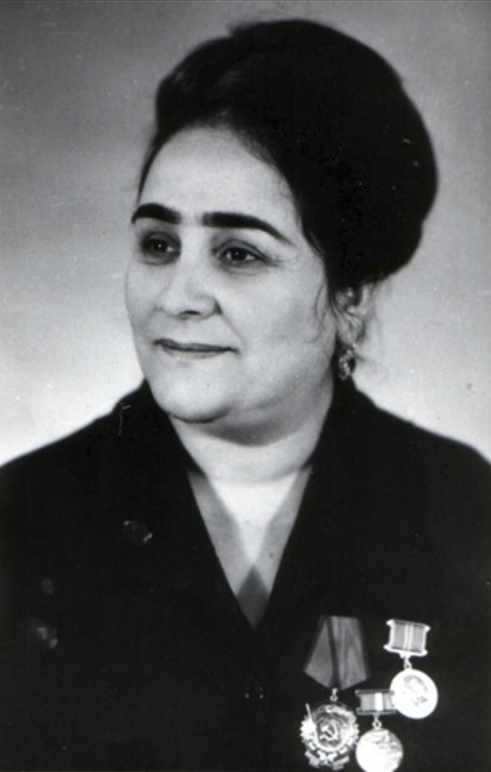

Background information
- Born: 12 May 1927; Tashkent, Uzbek SSR, Soviet Union
- Died: 7 September 2001 (aged 74) Ramla, Israel
- Genres: Shashmaqam, folk
- Occupation: Singer
- Years active: 1945–2001

Barno Iskhakova (12 May 1927 - 7 September 2001; Tajik: Барно Исҳоқова, Persian: برنا اسحاقوا, Russian: Барно Бераховна Исха́кова, Hebrew: ברנו יצחקובה) was a Soviet and Bukharian Jewish musician from Tajikistan.

== Early life ==
Iskhakova was born in Tashkent, Uzbek SSR to the traditional Bukharian Jewish family of Berakh and Rachel Iskhakov.

== Career ==
From 1941 to 1943, she worked as a librarian at Tashkent Secondary School No. 24, and between 1943 and 1945 as a singer for the choir of the Radio of the Uzbek SSR. She is the first woman to become a professional Shashmaqam singer. After the Second World War, she and her husband moved to Stalinabad (Dushanbe) and she made her career as a singer there, working from 1950 as a soloist at the Radio Department of the Tajik SSR. Barno Iskhakova was considered one of the greatest modern female singers in the history of Central Asia and Tajikistan. She was married to the singer Isroel Badalbayev, although she retained her original surname as a stage name.

Her first song, 'Allah', won an award in the National Review. She is considered a remarkable performer, in the same class as such other Tajik stars as Seeno, Davlatmand Kholov, and Daler Nazarov. Iskhakova became very famous for her renditions of traditional Shashmaqam songs in Tajik and Uzbek, and other songs in Russian, as well as in her mother tongue of Bukhori. She was known as the Queen of the Shashmaqam tradition of Tajik music, she sang side by side on the radio and television with other famous performers of the Tajik Soviet era, such as Neriyo Aminov, Rafael Tolmasov, Shoista Mullojonova, Hanifa Mavlianova, Rena Galibova, Ahmad Boboqulov, and others. Her repertoire consisted of more than 100 songs.

From 1980, Iskhakova also worked as a senior teacher in the Oriental Music Department of the Tajik State Institute of Arts in Dushanbe. When the Soviet Tajik writer Sadriddin Ayni heard her sing, he called her 'Levicha among women', for Levi (Levicha) Babakhanov was a famous Bukharian Jewish traditional singer who performed for the last Emir of Bukhara in the early 20th century. The Tajik folk singer and rubab player Jurabek Nabiev has said that he was inspired to pursue a professional career after listening to Iskhakova, who was his teacher.

She took part in the recording of the entire 'Shashmaqam' series, which is stored in the National Music Archives of Tajikistan.

== Awards and honors ==
She won the State Rudaki Prize of the Tajik SSR, the Order of the Red Banner of Labour, and the Order of the Badge of Honour as well as Honored and People's Artist of the Tajik SSR.

== Family ==
Barno Ishakova and Isroel Badalbayev had five children: Sofia, Olga, Tamara, Bertha, and Roman. Her daughter Sofia Badalbayeva lives in Israel and is also a Shashmaqam singer.

== Later life ==
She immigrated to Israel with her family in 1992 due to the Civil War in Tajikistan, and the rise of Islamic Fundamentalism following the collapse of the USSR. She died on September 7th, 2001, in Ramla, Israel.

She, along with her husband Isroel, are buried at the Har HaMenuchot Cemetery in Jerusalem.

== Legacy ==
In May 2017, the city of Petah Tikva named a street for her.

== See also ==
- Turkestan
- Uzbekistan
- Bukhara
- Bukharan Jews
- Shashmaqam
