= Ben-Menachem =

- Eli Ben-Menachem
- Remedy (rapper) a.k.a. Ross Filler, a.k.a. Reuven Ben Menachem
- Yemima Ben-Menahem
- Yoni Ben-Menachem
