= Nasirov =

Nasirov is a surname. Notable people with the surname include:

- Budag Nasirov (born 1996), Azerbaijani footballer
- Elman Nasirov (born 1968), Azerbaijani political scientist
- Jacob Nasirov, Bukharian rabbi
- Rafig Nasirov (1947–2024), Azerbaijani painter
- Roman Nasirov (born 1979), Ukrainian politician
