= Bukharan Jews in Israel =

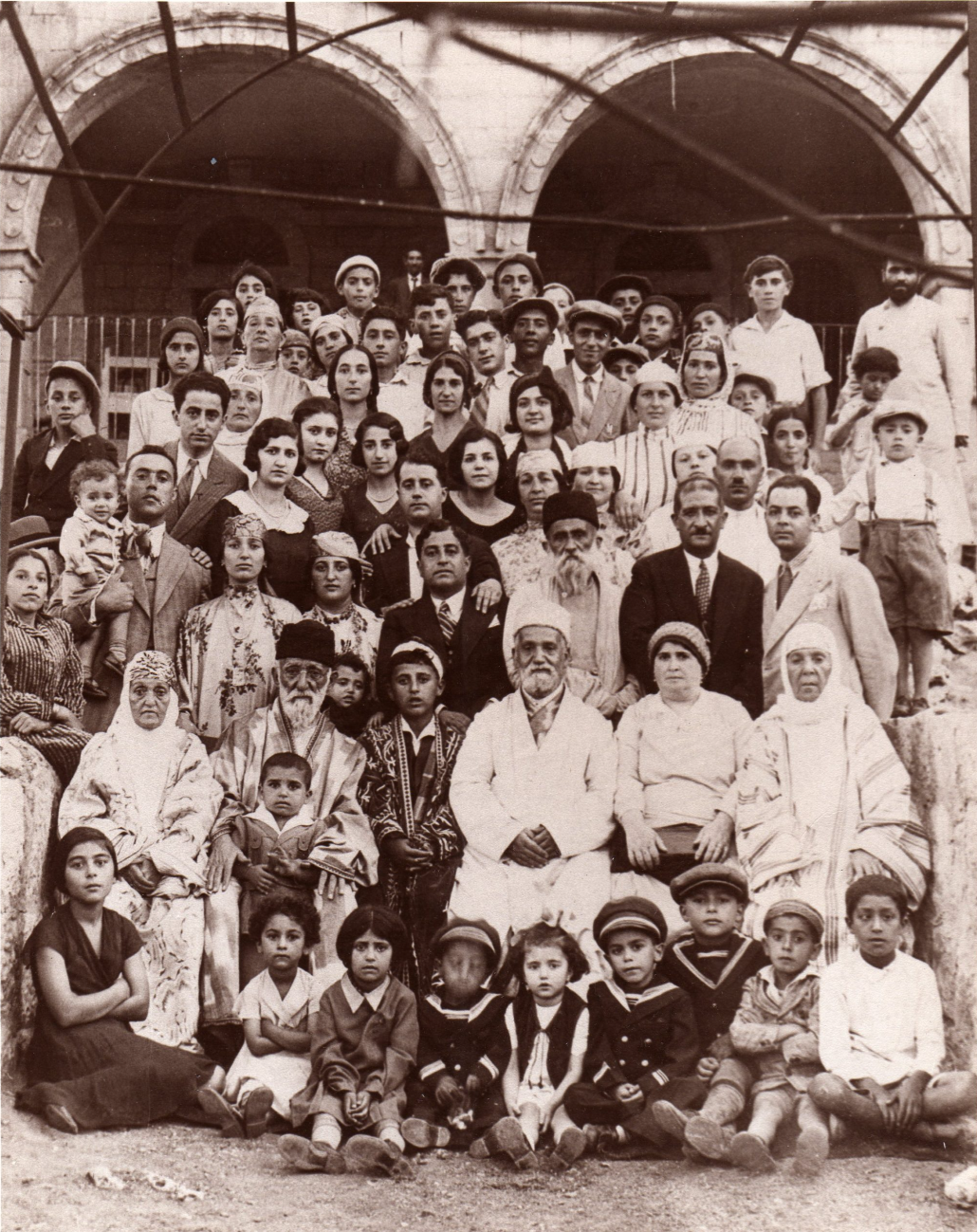
- Bukharan Jewish family in Jerusalem, at a Bar Mitzvah celebration, c. 1930s

Total population
- 160,000+

Regions with significant populations
- Jerusalem, Tel Aviv, Or Yehuda, Lod, Holon

Languages
- Hebrew, Judeo-Persian (Bukhori), Russian

Religion
- Orthodox Judaism

Bukharian Jews in Israel, also known as the Bukharim, refers to immigrants and descendants of the immigrants of the Bukharan Jewish communities, who now reside within the state of Israel.

== History ==
The first Bukharan Jews to make Aliyah arrived in the 1870s and 1880s, establishing the Bukharim quarter in Jerusalem.

=== 1881–1947 ===
In 1890, seven members of the Bukharan Jewish community formed the Hovevei Zion Association of the Jewish communities of Bukhara, Samarkand and Tashkent. By 1914, around 1,500 Bukharan Jews had immigrated, and 4,000 more arrived in the early 1930s. In 1940, publications in Bukhori were shut down by the Soviets along with most Bukharan schools. The Bukharan Jews tended to be richer than other Jewish groups immigrating to Palestine from Muslim majority countries. This wealth stemmed from economic opportunities that arose from the Russian conquest and colonization of Central Asia in the mid-to-late 19th century. This conquest also opened routes through the black sea to enable immigration to Palestine.They utilized their newly acquired wealth to make sizable donations to the Sephardi Rabbinate which contributed to positive relations between the two groups. Much of the traditions and customs of the Bukharan Jewish Community within Jerusalem were preserved with the Bukharim Quarter serving as a spiritual center. The preservation of this traditional way of life was aided by their tendency to form self-isolated communities. Following dwindling employment opportunities, the 1920’s saw a push for settlement outside of Jerusalem. Upon arrival in new cities, the Bukharim continued to establish self-isolated communities. In 1929, Bukharim across the various cities that had been settled in established a union called the Union of Bukharan Jews.

=== 1948–1990 ===
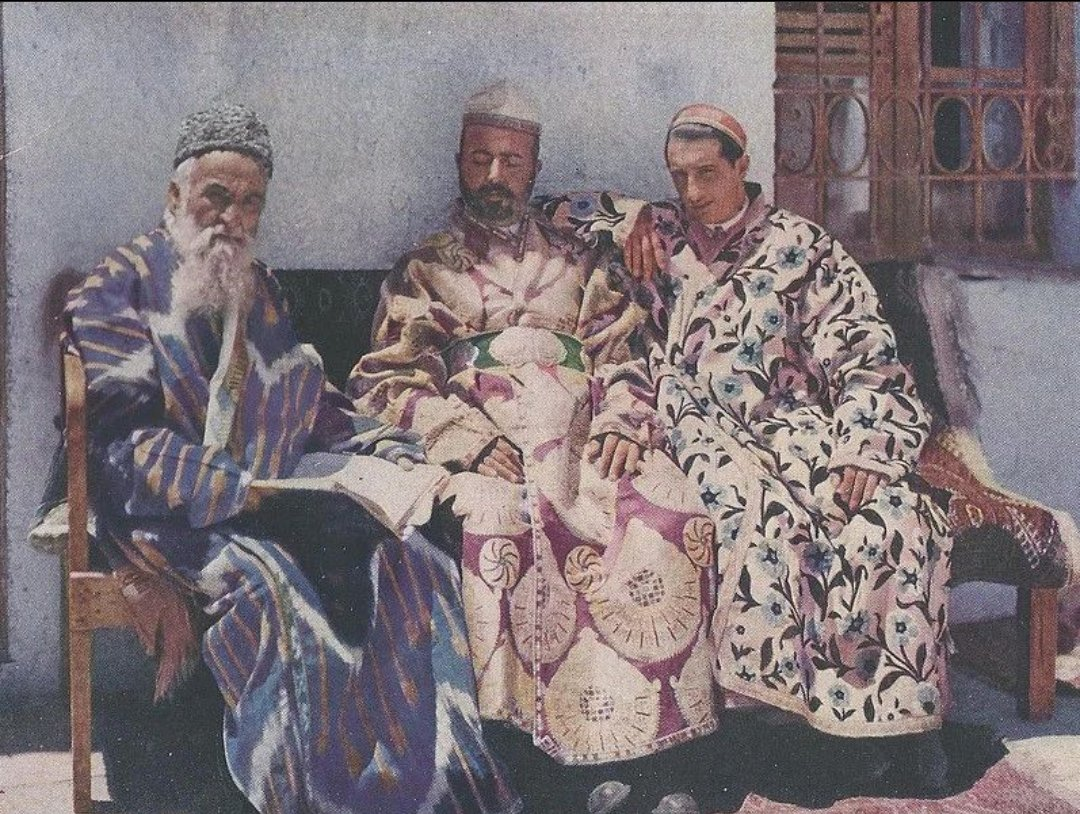
Bukharan Jews in Jerusalem, 1927

In 1948 began the "Black Years of Soviet Jewry," where suppression of the Jewish religion resumed after stopping due to war. In 1950 thirteen religious Bukharan Jews in Samarkand were arrested and sentenced to 25 years. Similar arrests happened to prominent Bukharim in Kattakurgan and Bukhara. The Six-Day War led to a rise in Jewish patriotism among Bukharan Jews and many carried out demonstrations as refuseniks. Until 1972, there was no major immigration of Bukharim to Israel. It was from then until 1975 when 8,000 managed to immigrate from the USSR. This new wave of Bukharim immigration was aided by the pre-existing communities within Israel. The Alliance of Bukhara Compatriots was founded to provide aid for the incoming Bukharim and assist in their integration into Israeli society. The Alliance provided financial aid as well as patronage for the arts, education, and literature. By 1987, 32,000 Bukharan Jews lived in Israel, around 40% of the Bukharim. In 1990, there were riots against the Jewish population of Andijan and nearby areas. This led to most Jews in the Fergana Valley immigrating to Israel or the United States.

=== 1990s–present ===
From 1989 to 2005 over 5,000 Bukharan Jews from Kyrgyzstan came to Israel due to increased hostility in the region. In 1992, there was a secret airlift operation which brought a small number of Bukharan Jews from Tajikistan to Israel. From 1989 to 2000, over 10,000 made aliyah from Tajikistan. Today, most Bukharim live in Israel with a significant population in America. Only 1,000 Jews remain in Tajikistan, 1,500 in Uzbekistan, and only 150 in the city of Bukhara. As of 1994, there were multiple Judeo-Tajik media platforms including a radio show run by the former Dean of the Faculty of Oriental Languages in Bukhara. Amnon Cohen, a former member of the Knesset is of Bukharan descent.

== See also ==
- Bukharan Jews
- Aliyah
- Iranian Jews in Israel
- Mountain Jews in Israel
- 1970s Soviet Union aliyah
- 1990s Post-Soviet aliyah
