= Yosef Maimon =

18th - 19th century Moroccan rabbi

Rabbi Yosef ben Moshe Mammon (Maimon) Maravi (1741 – 7 December 1822) is the spiritual leader credited with helping strengthen religious observance and introducing the Sephardic liturgy to the Bukharian Jewish community. The title Maaravi signifies his North African (Maghreb) ancestry.

== Biography ==
Born in Tetouan in Morocco, Rabbi Mammon made aliyah to teach in a yeshiva in the city of Safed. Like most yeshivas at the time, Maimon's yeshiva relied on donations from the diaspora communities. It was during his search for funds in 1793 that Rabbi Mammon arrived in Bukhara, and chose to stay, in order to strengthen Judaism within the local Jewish population. At the time, the region was under the control of Muslim fundamentalists, who pressured the local Jews to convert to Islam. The community's physical isolation from major centers of Jewish learning was a result of the Bukhara Emirate's policy of closed borders, intended to avoid involvement in the Great Game. For the local Jews, this meant fewer opportunities to connect with the larger Jewish community.

He established yeshivas, and his children continued his work. He also founded Hibbat Zion, a precursor to Zionism, and encouraged aliyah to Palestine.

Early 19th century travelers to Bukhara, including missionary Joseph Wolff, a Hebrew Christian, described in detail the impact of Yosef Mammon on the culture and religion of the Bukharian Jews.

Yosef Mammon died in Bukhara. One of his descendants was Rabbi Shimon Hakham. Another descendant was Esther Gaonoff, the wife of Shlomo Moussaieff (rabbi). Moussaieff's and Gaonoff's grandson is Shlomo Moussaieff (businessman) and their great grandchildren are author Jeffrey Moussaieff Masson and the former First Lady of Iceland Dorrit Moussaieff.

Another distant descendant, Iosef Yusupov, has worked as an artistic director and conceptual designer for the 2014 Winter Olympics opening ceremony in Sochi, Russia.
