= Assaf Atchildi =

Heroic Physician

Assaf Atchildi (Born 29 April 1898 - Died 1981) was a Bukharan and French Jewish doctor and surgeon. He is credited for risking his own life and saving over 300 Jews in Nazi-occupied France.

== Early life ==
Born in Samarkand (present day Uzbekistan) Assaf Atchildi moved to Moscow to study medicine at the University of Moscow. During his time in Russia, the Russian revolution occurred and he was considered a sympathizer. He was subsequently arrested and sent to a Siberia prison. His father became ill and he was granted a pass to visit him in Uzbekistan, once there he fled to Paris, France to continue his studies.

In the early 1920s he enrolled in the medical department at the University of Paris and completed is doctoral degree in 1928.

He then became an internal medicine specialist and performed surgeries in Paris and Vichy. While there he married Alexandra and they had two daughters Dora and Elvire. He also became the president of the Bukharian community.

== Career ==
Atchildi completed research as part of his doctoral theses in treatments for smallpox. He also published multiple other research concerning various medical treatments for different diseases.

== WWII ==
During the Second World War when Germany took over France, Atchildi never registered with the Nazis at the behest of his wife. They instead convinced officials that Jews from Bukhara were Jugutis, a made-up term that depicts Persians who practice the faith but are ethnically different, as determine by the Nazis. Atchildi along with Abdol Hossein Sardari an Iranian consul submitted documents to Nazi officials for the entire Bukharian Jewish community. This heroism saved the entire French Bukaharian Jewish community.

In 1941, six Jugutis who had registered with the police had been arrested and most of them were imprisoned in Drancy internment camp outside Paris. Using a German attestation to the Prefect of Police in Paris in early February 1942 that Jugutis were not to be subjected to Vichy's anti-Jewish laws, Atchildi was able to obtain the release of two of the prisoners from Drancy.

== Later in life ==
After the war, Atchildi moved to Vichy where he continued his practise until is retirement in the 1960s.

Thereafter, he wrote his memoir in 1967 which is featured within the Yad Vashem Holocaust Memorial. He wrote "The date of November 9, 1941 remains in my memory as a very happy day in my life, a day on which I learned that my existence in the world was meaningful inasmuch as I had successfully protected the members of my community in the darkest days of their lives".

== Honors ==
Atchildi was awarded the Medal of the City of Paris (French: Médaille de la Ville de Paris) for his efforts in the war.

In 2011, B'nai B'rith World Center bestowed the Jewish Rescuer's Citation on Dr.Assaf Atchildi's daughter Dora Aftergood in honor of her fathers heroism during Nazi-occupied France. The Jewish Rescuer's Citation recognizes Jews who endangered themselves to rescue and protect others during Nazi occupation.

In 2022, Eve Weinberg published her and her family's memoir which featured their story and how Dr. Atchildi aided in their survival.

In 2023, the Here to Tell: Faces of Holocaust Survivors launched at the glenbow museum in Calgary, Alberta. It features a movie, book and exhibition, telling the stories of living and deceased Holocaust survivors, Atchildi and his daughter Dora Aftergood are featured. The exhibit will be traveling to other cities within Canada later in 2024. The content has been praised and well received.
