= Shlomo Moussaieff =

Shlomo Moussaieff is the name of:

- Shlomo Moussaieff (rabbi) (1852–1922), one of the founders of the Bukharan Quarter in Jerusalem
- Shlomo Moussaieff (businessman) (1925–2015), Israeli-born businessman
