= Shimon Hakham =

Moroccan rabbi (1843–1910)

Rabbi Shimon Hakham
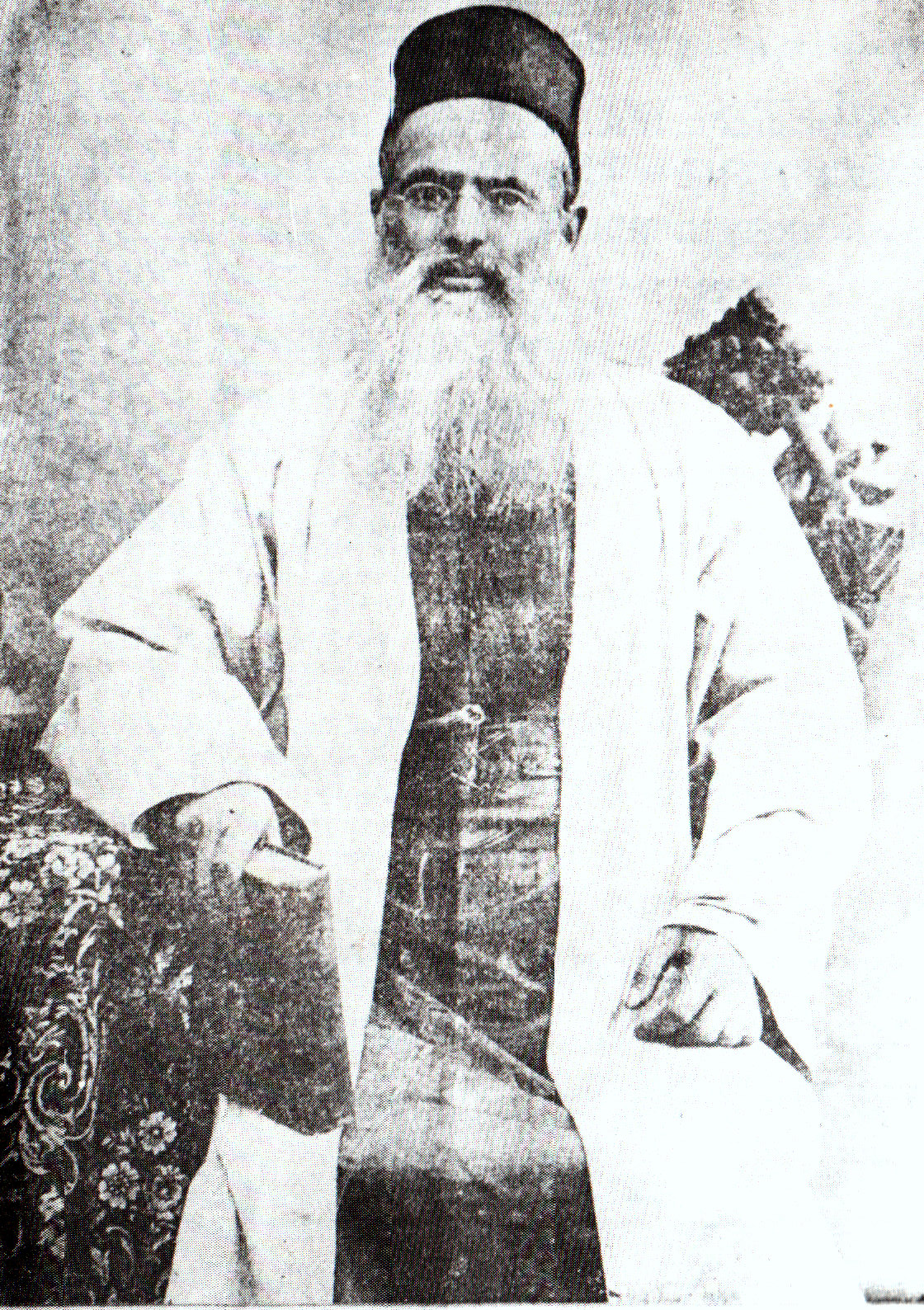

Personal life
- Born: Bukhara
- Died: Jerusalem
- Occupation: Rabbi

Religious life
- Religion: Judaism
- Denomination: Sephardi Orthodox Judaism

Jewish leader
- Other: Chief Rabbi of Bukharan Jews in Jerusalem
- Residence: Jerusalem

Rabbi Shimon Hakham (Hebrew: שמעון חכם; 1843, Bukhara - 1910, Jerusalem) was a Bukharan rabbi residing in Jerusalem who promoted literacy by translating Hebrew religious books into Bukhori.

Rabbi Hakham was born into a religious family in Bukhara and was the great-grandson of Rabbi Yosef Maimon. Hakkam's father, Eliyahu Hakham, was a Sofer from Iraq, who scribed torah scrolls in Baghdad. He later migrated to Bukhara for commercial purposes, working also as a shochet.

Taking a great interest in literature, Hakham spoke his native Persian, Hebrew, and Arabic. In 1870, he opened the "Talmid Hakham' yeshiva in Bukhara, where religious law was promoted.

At that time Bukharan Jews were getting only a general education, which mostly consisted of religious laws, reading, writing and some math. Even though studying religion took most of the time, many Bukharan Jews did not speak fluent Hebrew. Only a few books were written in Persian and many of them were old and incomplete. Hakham decided to change this situation by translating religious books into Bukharan language. But since there was no printing in Bukhara at that time, he went to Jerusalem to print his books. In 1892 Shimon Hakham was one of the organizers of Jerusalem’s Bukharan Quarter (Hebrew: Sh'hunat HaBucharim), where Bukharan synagogues, schools and printing were opened. A street in Jerusalem is named after the rabbi.

After coming back to Bukhara, where he distributed his books, Shimon again went to Jerusalem and spent there his remaining years. The period from 1900 until Shimon’s death in 1910 was one of the best in Bukharan literature. Hakham rewrote the whole Tanakh in the Bukharan language. He also wrote and translated the following books: Likudei dinim (1900), Dreams and their meaning (1901), Yosef and Zuleiha (1902), The Passover Haggadah (1904), and Meghilat Ester (1905). Among his secular translations was the novel Ahavat Zion (Kissaii Amnun va Tomor) by Avraham Mapu.

During his life Shimon Hakham wrote and translated into Bukharan more than 50 books. Many of his books and translations are still popular among Bukharan Jews. He died in 1910 and is buried on the Mount of Olives in Jerusalem.

In 1986, the Hebrew Union College published an English study and translation of Hakham's Musa-Nama, edited by Herbert. H. Paper. This work is Bukhori for "Book of Moses."

In 1991, he was honored with a postage stamp issued by the state of Israel, and a street is named after him in the Tel Arza neighborhood of Jerusalem.
