= Gavriel Mullokandov =

Bukharan Jewish musician and singer

Gavriel Aronovich Mullokandov
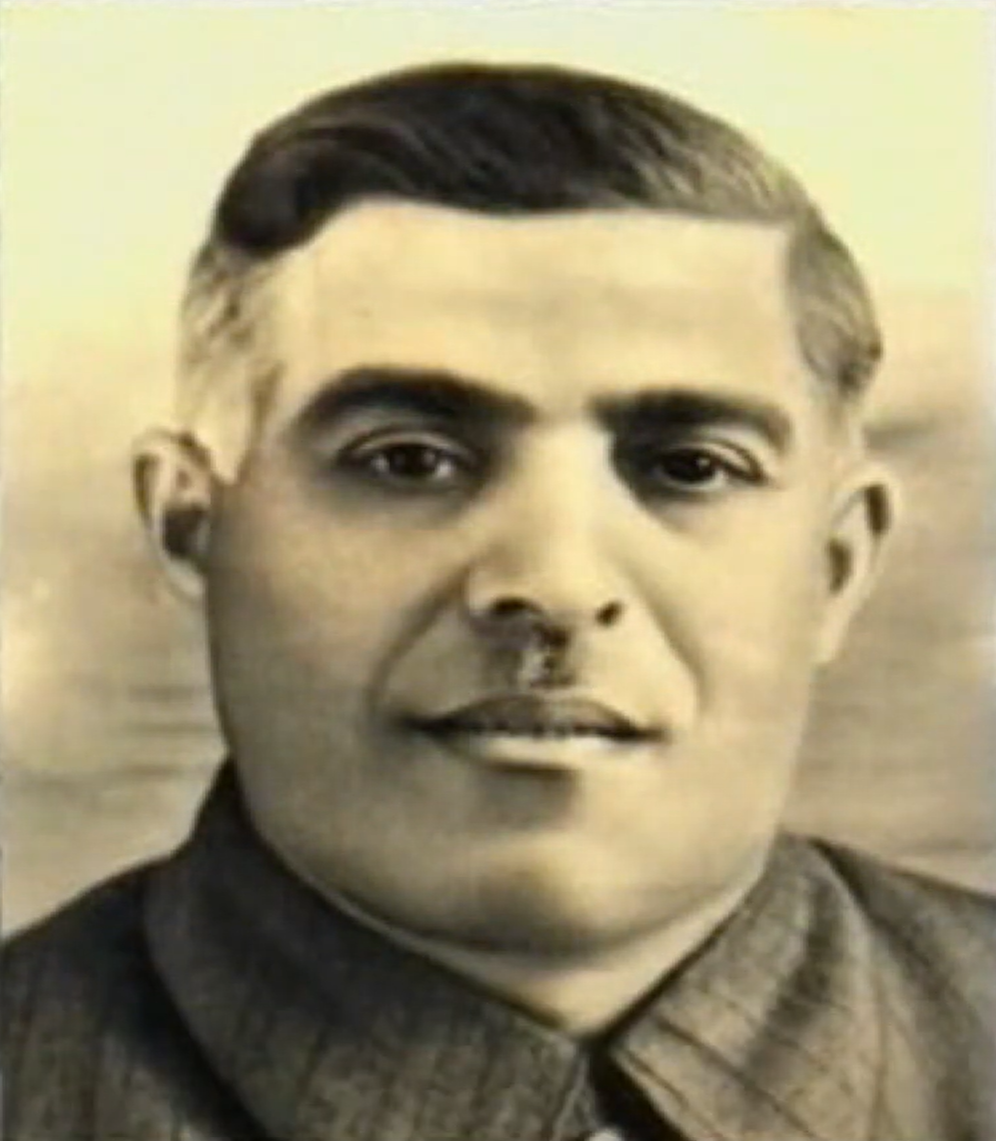
- Born: April 8, 1900; Samarkand, Emirate of Bukhara
- Died: February 6, 1972 (aged 71); Samarkand, Uzbek SSR, Soviet Union
- Other name: Gavriėl Aron ŭghli Mulloqandov
- Occupation: Singer

Gavriel Aronovich Mullokandov (Note: Uzbek: Гавриэл Арон ўғли Муллоқандов, romanized: Gavriėl Aron ŭghli Mulloqandov; Russian: Гавриэль Аронович Муллокандов, romanized: Gavriel Aronovich Mullokandov) (8 April 1900 – 6 February 1972) is regarded as the greatest Bukharian Jewish singer and musician. He was the People's Artist of Uzbekistan.

== Biography ==
Gavriel Mullokandov was born on 8 April 1900 in Samarkand, then in the Emirate of Bukhara, to a family of music lovers. Gavriel got much of his musical training from his older brothers and from the age of nine began to sing in synagogue. At the age of 11 he was already singing at weddings and concerts, and the public loved him. From his childhood, he learned the shashmaqam music style and could play a number of instruments, including the doira.

During the 1920s Gavriel worked with his brother Mikhael, who was also one of the greatest singers and musicians in Central Asia. In 1925–26 they were joined by Levi Bobokhanov, who once was a court musician of Emir of Bukhara. Bobokhanov was the tutor and mentor of the musician Mikhael Tolmasov, who later performed with Mullokandov at the Bukharian Jewish theatre Tarbut.

In the 1930s Gavriel and Mikhael Mullokandov, together with other activists, organized and received a commission to form the Bukharan Jewish Musical Drama Theater in Samarkand. In it, they were joined by outstanding Bukharian Jewish performers such as Aron Saidov, Murduhai Bachaev and Bahor Kandhorov. After 1934, the theatre performed in Stalinabad (present-day Dushanbe) where a small community of Bukharian Jews lived; some joined as new performers in the troupe. However, due to repressive policies and Stalinist purges, the theatre closed in 1940. The Bukharan Jewish Musical Drama Theater opened in Israel years later and continued performing musicals in the Bukharian language. In 1936 Gavriel and Mikhael became the first Bukharian Jews awarded the title of People's Artist of Uzbekistan. In the following years Gavriel was awarded with many other government awards. In 1940 he was elected to the City Council of Samarkand. During the Second World War, he was among the artists of Bukharian Jewish Theater, who traveled around the USSR performing in support of the war effort. Mullokandov was respected by Uzbeks, Tajiks, Russians, and was friends with Uzbek poet Gʻafur Gʻulom. In the late 1960s, Mullokandov established the ensemble 'Shashmaqom' that included musicians from several musical dynastic families, including Tolmasov. The group was honored with the 'People's Ensemble' title in 1973 and invited to perform as part of an academic study on Uzbek folk music.

== Political life ==
Mullokandov was elected to public office in Samarkand in 1940 and headed the Bukhara region's art department. He had been elected to the Supreme Soviet of the Uzbek Soviet Socialist Republic in 1938 and remained until 1946.

== Personal life ==
Mullokandov had seven children, including Nison and Roshel Mullokandov who became performers of traditional Bukharian music and opera singing, respectively.

Mullokandov died on 6 February 1972. In 1976 the Central Committee of the Communist Party of Uzbekistan renamed Eastern Street in Samarkand, where he was born and lived most of his life, in his honor. In 2000, a street in the city of Ramla, Israel was named after him.
