= Alexandre Reza =

Russian born French jeweller (1922 - 2016)

Alexande_Reza

Alexandre Reza (November 1, 1922 – January 15, 2016) was a Paris-based jeweler known for his diverse and rare collection of precious gemstones. He is lauded as the greatest gem collector of modern times.

== Biography ==
Alexandre Reza was born Alexandre Elishev (Hebrew: אלכסנדר אלישייב) on November 1, 1922 in Moscow, to Bukharan Jews parents from ancient Samarkand heritage who left in 1908. The son of a jeweler, he moved to Paris with his family when he was a child. He set out on his own at the age of eighteen, the same time as the onset of World War II.

== Career ==
After the war, he began his career as a diamond expert, traveling extensively to source each stone, which served as the key design inspiration for his work. Early on, he supplied gems to jewelry brands such as Boucheron, Bulgari, Cartier, Chaumet, Harry Winston, Louis Gérard, and Van Cleef & Arpels.

After more than three decades of acquiring and selectively selling fine diamonds, he founded his eponymous jewelry house in 1981 on the Place Vendôme in Paris. He also established retail presence in Geneva, Cannes and Monaco to offer Haute Joaillerie: suites of necklaces, bracelets, earrings, rings, and objets d'art made from rare diamonds, emeralds, rubies, and sapphires. Alexandre Reza’s creations are known for their opulence, splendor, extravagance, and extraordinary craftsmanship. According to auction house Sotheby's, "movement, lightness, composition, and harmony are the key words of his designs." In 1997, The Mirror described him as "probably the top jeweller in the world for the rich, famous and royalty." Previously, he has been a target of high-stakes theft. In June 2001, a necklace worth EUR 1.8M was stolen from the brand's salon in Cannes. In 1994, armed robbers stole approximately $21 million in gems from the jeweler's salon in Paris.

In May 2010, Sotheby's sold a 5.02-carat fancy vivid blue diamond set in a toi-et-moi (me and you) ring alongside a white 5.42-carat diamond for US$6.3 million, establishing an auction record price for a jewel by Alexandre Reza. In November 2010, a pair of fancy blue diamond and diamond pendant ear clips "soared to $1.79 million, tripling the low end of its pre-sale estimate."

== Legacy ==
His work has been featured in books such as Alexandre Reza: Dreams of Yesterday, Realities of Today (1985) and Alexandre Reza: Stones of Light (1991). The first, whose introduction was penned by director of the Jacquemart-Andre Museum Rene Huygue, was compiled to document an exhibition at the Paris-based Museum. As part of the Ultimate Collection, Assouline published a monumental edition in 2012 entitled Alexandre Reza, presenting more than one hundred rare pieces of Reza's creations, and a history of the famed gem house in archival documents and vintage photography. In June 1988, his private collection of fine jewelry and gems was showcased at the Cooper Hewitt Museum in New York.

In early 2008, Olivier Reza, the son of Alexandre Reza who frequently traveled with his father to examine and acquire rare stones, returned to lead the company following a successful career in international banking. He downsized the Paris salon, as well as sold all European stores. In June 2012, he re-opened a salon on the Place Vendome, and recently completed his first jewelry pieces with an eye towards continuing the family’s legacy and expanding the Alexandre Reza collection.
