= Avi Benedi =

Israeli singer and songwriter

Avi Benedi אבי בנדי
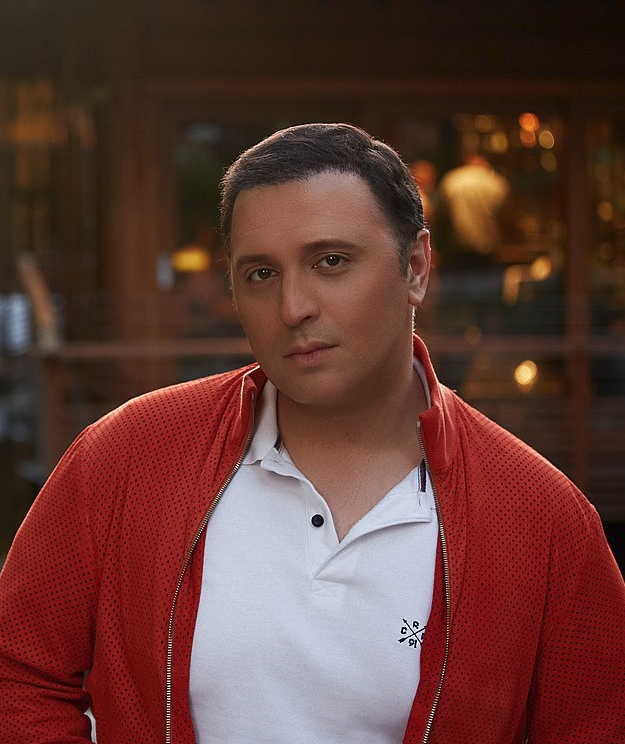

Background information
- Born: Avi Benedi; 2 April 1980 (age 46); Israel
- Genres: Pop-folk, Pop music, Disco
- Occupations: Singer-songwriter; musician
- Instruments: Vocals; Guitar; Drums; piano
- Years active: 2001 – present
- Label: Payner Music
- Website: http://avi-benedi.com/

Avi Benedi (Hebrew: אבי בנדי; born 2 April 1980) is an Israeli singer and songwriter. He has released three albums: Avi Benedi & Diamond Band in 2001 (in Austria), We Met Late (Встретились поздно) in 2012 (in Russia). and Loco in 2017.

== Personal life ==
Avi Benedi was born in Israel on 2 April 1980, to a Bukharian Jewish family. When he was four years old, his family moved to Vienna, Austria. His father, Eduard Babadost, is a famous tenor in Austria, and his grandfather was a folk artist in Tajikistan. Benedi has two brothers: one is a jewelry and fashion designer, and the other is the music video director Lior Babadost.

Benedi speaks and sings in Hebrew, English, Uzbek,German, Russian, Bulgarian, several dialects of Persian (including Bukhori, Western Farsi, Juhuri), Slovak and Romanian.

== Career ==
=== Career beginning: 1999–2013 ===
Benedi graduated from the College of Photography and Film Arts in Vienna. From 1999 until 2008, he worked as operator-in-charge at the Austrian TV channel ATV.

He began writing his own music and working professionally with his band, which was called Diamond Band. Together, they became very popular and, in the period 2003–2006, performed many concerts across the world. In Israel, Avi Benedi and the Diamond Band had their breakthrough hit with the song Live Like In A Movie, which was at the top of the music charts for four weeks.

In 2006, Benedi launched his solo career in Russia, where he moved to live for several years working together with Philipp Kirkorov on several projects.

=== Payner Music: 2014–present ===
Since the beginning of 2014, Benedi has been working with the Bulgarian record label Payner. As a singer and composer, he became well-known in Bulgaria for his two collaborations with the singer Emilia: "Кой ще му каже" ("Boi Tegali Li") and "Balkania".

After the success of his two duets with Emilia, Benedi gained popularity in Bulgaria and has been a special guest at concerts broadcast by the TV channel Planeta and on many TV shows. His duets with Emilia also led to his involvement in the Planeta Summer 2014 national tour. In February 2015, Who Will Tell Him won the Best Duet of 2014 prize at Planeta’s Annual Music Awards.

On 29 October 2014, Benedi launched his first solo project: "Боже, пази" ("God Help Them"). It was dedicated to the human tragedy resulting from the catastrophic floods in Bulgaria in 2014.

In 2015 he released two more solo songs "За теб, Любов" ("Forou, Love"), written by him and the poet Doni Vasileva, and "Хубав е Живота" ("Life is Beautiful") with Anelia performing the backing vocals. He announced his new song "Истинска Жена" ("True Woman") together with Maria and Gumzata. Benedi wrote the Hebrew part of the song and the Bulgarian part was written by Marieta Angelova. The video was released on 15 February 2016.

In May 2016, Benedi released a new song featuring the young Armenian star Alex, "Ekel em Yerevan" ("Ekel in Yerevan"). In June 2016 Benedi wrote the music for and arranged three songs. For Serbia, Andreana Cekic presented "300 svatova", and her colleague Jelena Paunovic presented the song "Zeni Me". For Israel, rapper Subliminal presented "Tzeva Lahaim", which became a hit in just a few days.

Benedi began 2017 by releasing a new single, "Войната в мен" ("The war within me") on 4 January, written by Anastasiya Mavrodieva, with the video directed by his brother, Lior Babadost.

On 8 March 2017 Benedi promoted his new single "La Vida Amiga" with a video directed by Ivaylo Petkov, and announced that a Spanish album was in production. The song itself became a hit in Germany, trending on YouTube Germany, MTV Germany and Switzerland and Viva Germany. On 9 June 2017 he realised his new single "Oye Señorita" written by Benedi and Sevdalina Dyakova with a video directed by Lior Babadost; a week later the song was released to the Bulgarian public. His Spanish album was released in late 2017 and the song "La Vida Amiga" is reported to have attracted the attention of Universal Music.

== Music videos ==
Song	Air date	Director
"Встретились поздно" (feat Lora Safonova)	29 Feb 2012	Lior Babadost
"Кой ще му каже"/"Boi tegali li" (feat Emilia)	21 Feb .2"014	Lior Babadost
Балкания" (feat Emilia and MC Brian)	20 Jun 2014	Lior Babadost
"Боже, пази"	29 Sep 2014	Lior Babadost
"За теб, любов"	8 May 2015	Lior Babadost
"Хубав е животът"	19 Aug 2015	Lior Babadost
"Истинска жена"/"Zug yonim" (feat Maria and Gumzata)	15 Feb 2016	Lior Babadost
"Идем В Армения"/"Ekel em Yerevan" (feat Alex)	16 May 2016	Zara Nazaryan
"Войната в мен"	4 January 2017	Lior Babadost
"La Vida Amiga"	8 March 2017	Ivaylo Petkov
"Oye Señorita"	9 June 2017	Lior Babadost
"Bailame Asi"	22 March 2018	Lior Babadost
"Nyakoi Den"	6 June 2018	Niki Skerlev
"Bratan"	23 November 2018	Avi Benedi
"Million, Million"	25 October 2019	
Група "Трик" feat. Avi Benedi feat. Jessica - Baile Fervoroso	3 September 2019	
Kolko oshte	7 August 2020	
ЛЮБОВЬ МЕЛОДРАМА	14 February 2020	
IZOLIRAN	8 May 2020	
AVI BENEDI & IVY & JOKER - VAKSINA	23 December 2020	
POSLEDEN TANTS	30 April 2021	
JOKER ft. AVI BENEDI - INTRIGANTI	31 March 2021	
AVI BENEDI & DJ JIVKO MIX ft. YANITSA-DA GARMIM	1 Jule 2021	
IVY, AVI BENEDI & JOKER - TIGRE, TIGRE	3 June 2021	
Avi Benedi & Sasha SANDRA - Грешната любов	10 February 2023	
Avi Benedi - Ti zhe znaesh	23 November 2022	
Avi Benedi - Bukharian Popuri	2 April 2023	
Avi Benedi - ЭРИ БИРОРМЭ ГЕРМАН ЗАХАРЬЯЕВ	7 Jule 2023	
Avi Benedi - Королева	15 March 2023	
Avi Benedi - Gole sangam	19 June 2023	

== Studio albums ==
List of studio albums, with selected chart positions, sales figures and certifications
Title	Album details	Sales	Certifications
Avi Benedi & Diamond Band	Released: 2001; Label: Avi Benedi Music Productions; Formats: Cassette, CD, LP		
We Met Late (Встретились поздно)	Released: 2012; Label: Avi Benedi Music Productions; Formats: Cassette, CD, digital download, LP		
Loco	Released: 2017; Label: NJoy Media; Formats: Cassette, CD, digital download, LP		

== Musical performances ==
=== Concerts ===
- 2013 Аnnual „Planeta“ awards – perf. „Кой ще му каже/Boi tegali li“
- „Planeta“ Summer Tour 2014 – perf. „Балкания“ и „Кой ще му каже/Boi tegali li“
- 13 years television „Planeta“ – perf. „Боже, пази“
- Television „Planeta“ Awards 2014 – perf. „Кой ще му каже/Boi tegali li“
- Television „Planeta“ Awards 2015 – perf. „Истинска жена/Zug yonim“

=== In TV and festive music programs ===
- Christmas Concert „Една нощ в Приказките“ 2014 – perf. „Боже, пази“
