= Jacob Nasirov =

Bukharian rabbi

Jacob Nasirov is a prominent Bukharian rabbi residing in Jamaica Estates, Queens, New York. His family originated in Bukhara and immigrated to Afghanistan in 1932. At age 5, his family made aliyah to Israel. After serving in the Israel Defense Forces and working for a few years, in 1980 he was called to serve as the hazan and rabbi of Anshei Shalom synagogue, the only Afghan-Jewish congregation in the United States. He is currently the Rabbi of Congregation Bet-El - Sephardic Center of Jamaica Estates. Nasirov was at one time a kosher certifier of restaurants, but he is no longer involved in this.

== Sources ==
- Lee, Felicia R. "Coping: Afghan Jews Look Back in Sorrow" New York Times Dec. 30, 2001
- Pomerance, Rachel "Because 'Jews are news,' feuding Afghans make CNN" Jewish Telegraphic Agency Dec. 14, 2001
- Bio on Synagogue website
