= Rena Galibova =

Tajikistani actor

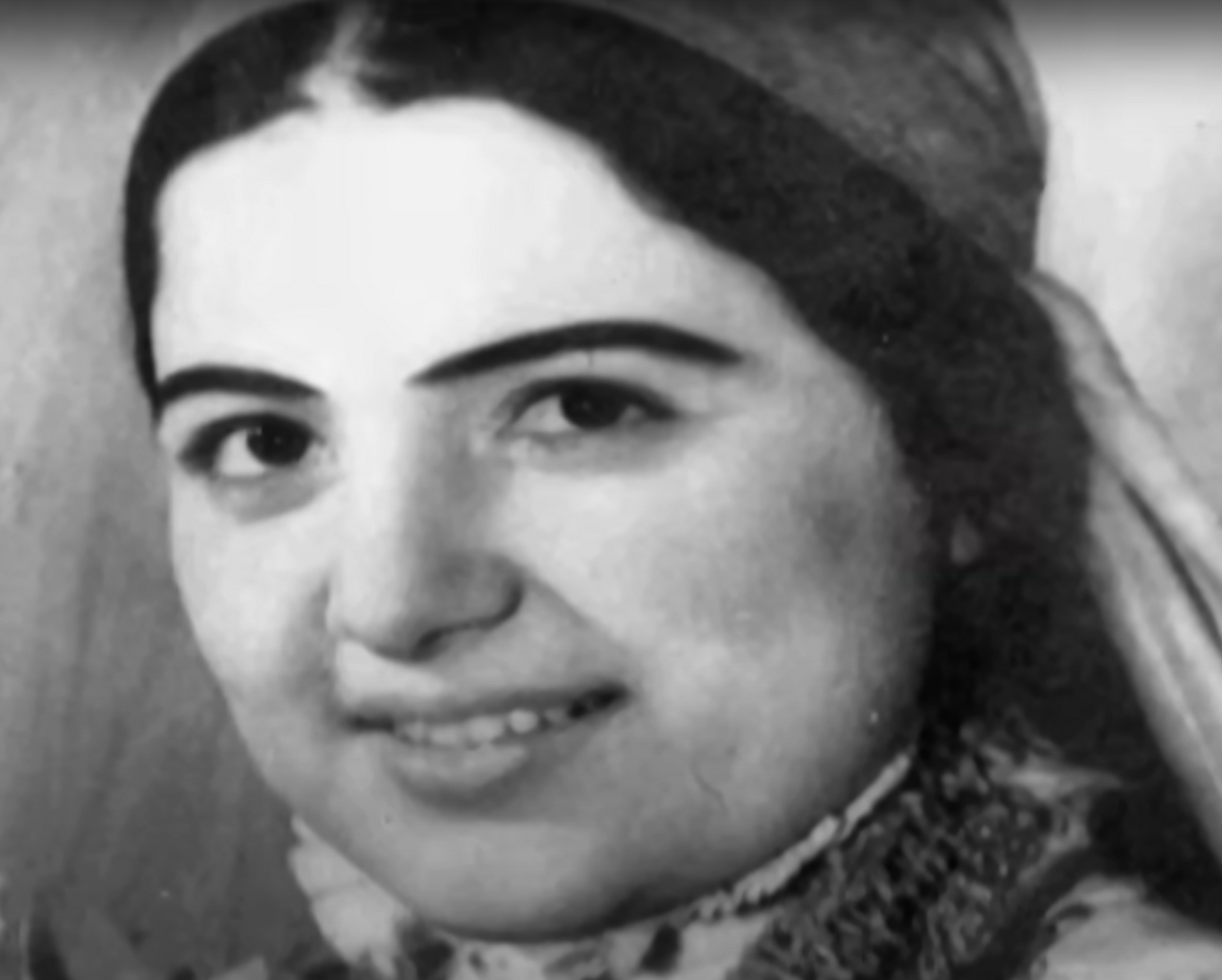

Background information
- Born: May 24, 1915; Kokand, Turkestan Krai, Russian Empire
- Died: October 13, 1995 (aged 80) Boston, Massachusetts, USA
- Genres: Shashmaqom, Opera, Folk
- Occupations: Opera singer, folk singer
- Years active: 1935–1995
- Formerly of: Shoista Mullodzhanova

Rena Galibova (24 May 1915 – 13 October 1995) was a Soviet actress and opera singer who was named People's Artist of Tajikistan. She was born in the city of Kokand in 1915 to a Bukharan Jewish family. Her childhood years were spent in Tashkent, where her father was a theatrical producer.

Owing to the musical education acquired from her father, Galibova began her theatrical career at the age of 13. She was soon noticed, and by the age of 18 she had been invited to work at Tashkent Radio. There she worked with many famous artists.

In 1934, she married a well-known Bukharan-Jewish writer, Gavriel Samandarov, and in 1938 they moved to Stalinabad (now Dushanbe), Tajikistan. From there, Galibova continued her theatrical career at the Theatre of Opera and Ballet, where she took on many leading roles.

In 1939, Galibova was awarded the title of Merited Artist of Tajikistan, and in 1941 she was given the title of People's Artist of Tajikistan, as well as the Order of Lenin, after she performed in front of Joseph Stalin and he was very impressed by her talent.

During the Second World War, she was one of many Jewish artists who performed throughout the USSR in the war effort. After the war, Galibova continued to perform in many cities and towns of the USSR, such as Saint Petersburg. In 1957, she was welcomed on the stage of the Bolshoi Theatre in Moscow. Later in her life, Rena Galibova moved to the United States and lived in Boston, where she died at the age of 80 in 1995. Her gravestone, in Mount Carmel Cemetery, Queens, reads 'Honoured Artist of Tajikistan'.
