= Hanifa Mavlianova =

Opera singer and educator from Tajikistan

Hanifa Muhiddinovna Mavlianova (Tajik: Ҳанифа Муҳиддиновна Мавлонова, Russian: Ханифа Мухиддиновна Мавлянова; 30 January 1924 – 24 October 2010) was a Soviet and Tajik soprano opera and concert singer, born in Leninabad (today Khujand), Tajikistan. She graduated from the musical college in her home town in 1936. From 1943, she worked as soloist at the Ayni Opera and Ballet Theatre in Dushanbe. She furthered her studies at the Moscow State Conservatory from 1952 to 1959. Mavlianova received the Order of Lenin and the Order of the Red Banner of Labour and was granted a title of People's Artist of the USSR in 1968. She was also a professor of music from 1978 and served as a deputy of the Supreme Soviet.

After the Tajikistani Civil War intensified, Mavlianova moved to Moscow where she lived the last years of her life. Aged 86, she died in a Moscow after a long illness. Her body was then transported to Tajikistan and she was buried in Dushanbe.
