= Yoni Ben-Menachem =

Israeli journalist

- יוני בן-מנחם
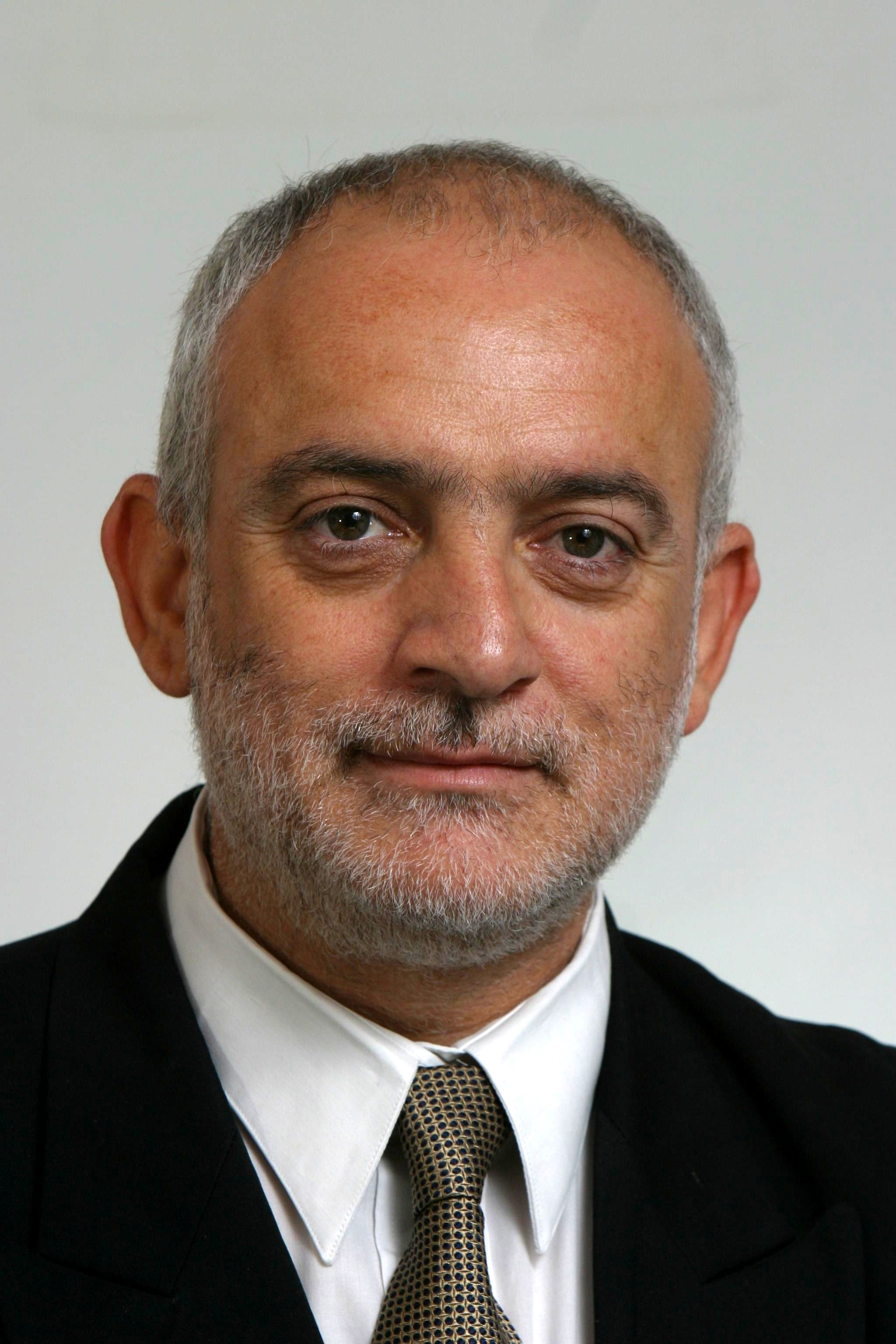
- Born: 1957 (age 68–69)
- Occupation: Journalist
- Years active: 1980s-

Yoni Ben-Menachem (Hebrew: יוני בן-מנחם; born 1957) is an Israeli journalist and a Senior Researcher at the Jerusalem Center for Public Affairs (JCPA) from 2014. Before that he was the General Director and Chief Editor of The Israel broadcasting Authority (IBA) from 2011 to 2014. In 2003 he was appointed General Director and Chief Editor of Israel Radio-KOL Israel.

Ben-Menachem was born and raised in Jerusalem served in the Intelligence Unit in the Israel Defense Forces and released with the rank of captain. After his release he pursued his studies at the Hebrew University gaining a first Degree in Arabic Language and Literature & his second Degree in East Asian Studies, the latter which helped achieve a job as a producer of a Japan-based Israeli television station. Finishing a course for Correspondents at the Israel Broadcasting Authority (IBA) in 1983 following which he fulfilled several journalistic missions amongst which were correspondent for West Bank & Gaza Affairs for Israel Channel One and Kol Israel.

Ben-Menachem was commissioned by the IBA as their correspondent to Tunis in 1993 and was the first Israeli Journalist to interview Yasser Arafat before the signing of the Oslo Accords. In 2003 he was appointed general director and chief editor of Israel Radio Kol Israel in a tender of the IBA and later on as the General Director and Chief Editor of The Israel Broadcasting Authority (IBA).
