= Amnon Cohen =

Israeli politician

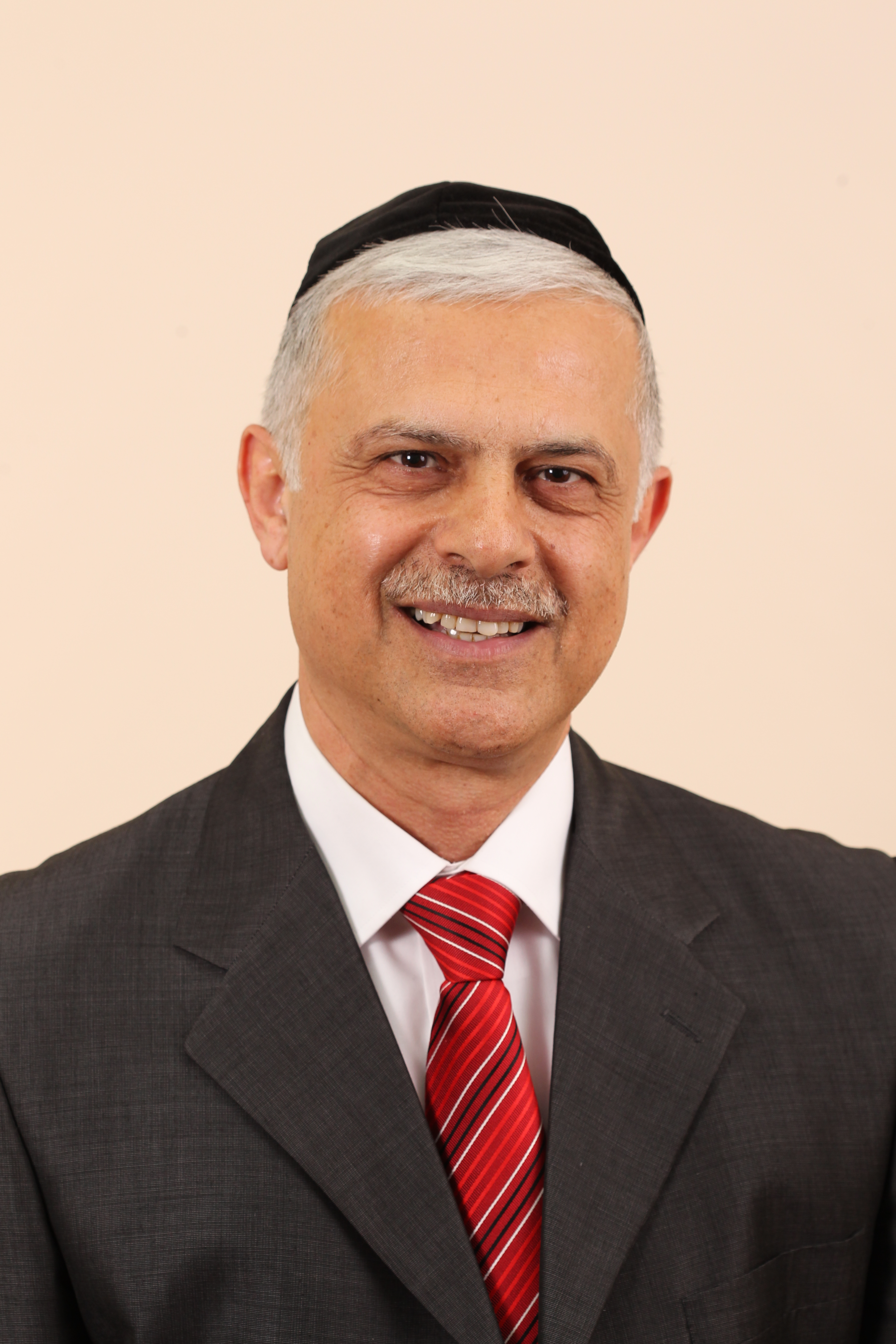
- Cohen in 2013

Faction represented in the Knesset
- 1999–2015: Shas

Personal details
- Born: 1 June 1960 (age 66) Samarkand, Uzbek SSR, Soviet Union

Amnon Cohen (Hebrew: אמנון כהן; born 1 June 1960) is an Israeli former politician. He served as a member of the Knesset for Shas from 1999 until 2015.

== Biography ==
Born in Samarkand in the Soviet Union (today in Uzbekistan), Cohen made aliyah to Israel in 1973. He gained a BA in business administration at the Center for Academic Studies in Kiryat Ono and took a two-year course at the Institute for Local Government in Bar-Ilan University.

Cohen served as deputy mayor and acting mayor of Ramla, and chaired the city's Organisation for Prisoner Rehabilitation. He has also been a member of the city union on Secondary Education, the Ayalon Sewage Programme, the Ayalon Fire Department and the board of Amal College.

He was first elected to the Knesset on Shas' list in 1999 and chaired the Public Petitions committee. He retained his seat in the 2003 elections, after which he chaired the State Control and Economic Affairs committees. He was re-elected again in 2006 and served as a Deputy Speaker of the Knesset. In 2006 he won the Quality of Government Badge for legislators. He retained his seat in the 2009 elections after being placed fourth on the Shas list. He was re-elected again in 2013.

Prior to the 2015 elections Cohen announced that he would not contest the elections and would leave the Knesset. In 2016 he was investigated for allegations of corruption, following an investigative report on Israel Channel 2. The case was closed in June 2021 due to difficulties in collecting evidence.
