= Hoshiiwato Yūji =

Japanese sumo wrestler

Personal information
- Native name: 星岩涛 祐二
- Born: Yūji Noguchi; 25 July 1955 (age 71) Kaimon, Kagoshima, Japan
- Height: 1.82 m (5 ft 11 1/2 in)
- Weight: 138 kg (304 lb; 21.7 st)

Sport
- Sport: Sumo
- Retired: January, 1991
- Heya: Izutsu → Michinoku
- Record: 552-549-15
- Debut: May, 1970
- Highest rank: Maegashira 14 (July, 1989)
- Elder name: Michinoku
- Championships: 1 (Makushita)
- Updated on June 2020

Hoshiiwato Yūji (born 25 July 1955 as Yūji Noguchi) is a former sumo wrestler from Kaimon, Kagoshima, Japan. He made his professional debut in May 1970 and reached the top division in July 1989, 115 tournaments later. This was the slowest ever rise to the top division. His highest rank was maegashira 14. Upon retirement from active competition after the January 1991 tournament, where he faced demotion to the makushita division, he became an elder in the Japan Sumo Association and took over as head coach at Michinoku stable. He oversaw the promotion to the jūryō division of two wrestlers from Argentina, Hoshitango and Hoshiandesu. He left the Sumo Association in December 1997 and was succeeded as head coach by former ōzeki Kirishima. He ran a restaurant in Kagoshima city after leaving sumo.

Throughout his long career, Hoshiiwato changed his shikona or fighting name eight times, making his debut under his family name of Noguchi and then being variously known as Kaimondake, Hoshikabuto, Satsumafuji, Hoshisatsuma, Oiwato, Hoshiiwato, Hoshikabuto (again) and finally Hoshiiwato again. This is believed to be a record.

== Career record ==
Hoshiiwato Yūji
Year	January Hatsu basho, Tokyo	March Haru basho, Osaka	May Natsu basho, Tokyo	July Nagoya basho, Nagoya	September Aki basho, Tokyo	November Kyūshū basho, Fukuoka
1970	x	x	(Maezumo)	East Jonokuchi #8; 5–2	West Jonidan #61; 1–6	East Jonidan #82; 5–2
1971	West Jonidan #39; 2–5	West Jonidan #55; 5–2	West Jonidan #18; 0–5–2	West Jonidan #59; 5–2	West Jonidan #22; 3–4	East Jonidan #37; 3–4
1972	West Jonidan #48; 4–3	West Jonidan #28; 4–3	West Jonidan #16; 3–4	East Jonidan #23; 4–3	West Jonidan #12; 3–4	West Jonidan #20; 5–2
1973	East Sandanme #58; 2–5	West Jonidan #2; 4–3	East Sandanme #69; 4–3	East Sandanme #58; 2–5	West Jonidan #2; 4–3	West Sandanme #65; 4–3
1974	East Sandanme #50; 4–3	East Sandanme #40; 3–4	East Sandanme #54; 2–5	East Sandanme #74; 4–3	West Sandanme #61; 4–3	West Sandanme #48; 6–1
1975	West Sandanme #14; 4–3	East Sandanme #2; 1–6	West Sandanme #32; 2–5	East Sandanme #55; 2–5	West Sandanme #78; 3–4	East Jonidan #14; 5–2
1976	East Sandanme #68; 6–1	West Sandanme #25; 6–1	East Makushita #48; 5–2	East Makushita #32; 3–4	East Makushita #40; 1–6	West Sandanme #5; 4–3
1977	West Makushita #50; 5–2	West Makushita #29; 3–4	East Makushita #40; 4–3	West Makushita #27; 5–2	East Makushita #17; 2–5	East Makushita #36; 2–5
1978	West Makushita #57; 4–3	East Makushita #44; 1–6	West Sandanme #9; Sat out due to injury 0–0–7	West Sandanme #9; 2–5	East Sandanme #36; 5–2	East Sandanme #5; 6–1
1979	West Makushita #30; 3–4	East Makushita #39; 3–4	East Makushita #51; 4–3	East Makushita #42; 2–5	East Sandanme #5; 3–4	West Sandanme #18; 2–5
1980	West Sandanme #44; 6–1	East Makushita #60; 4–3	East Makushita #50; 4–3	West Makushita #41; 3–4	West Makushita #50; 4–3	East Makushita #38; 4–3
1981	West Makushita #31; 3–4	West Makushita #41; 6–1	West Makushita #15; 5–2	West Makushita #5; 4–3	East Makushita #3; 6–1	West Jūryō #11; 4–11
1982	West Makushita #6; 3–4	West Makushita #11; 5–2	East Makushita #4; 3–4	East Makushita #8; 6–1	East Makushita #2; 1–6	West Makushita #24; 3–4
1983	East Makushita #33; 4–3	East Makushita #30; 5–2	East Makushita #14; 5–2	East Makushita #6; 4–3	East Makushita #3; 5–2	West Jūryō #11; 7–8
1984	West Jūryō #12; 8–7	West Jūryō #8; 6–9	East Jūryō #12; 7–8	East Makushita #1; 3–4	West Makushita #5; 4–3	East Makushita #3; 3–4
1985	West Makushita #8; 3–4	West Makushita #15; 5–2	West Makushita #7; 5–2	East Makushita #2; 3–4	West Makushita #7; 4–3	East Makushita #4; 2–5
1986	East Makushita #17; 4–3	West Makushita #11; 2–5	West Makushita #28; 5–2	East Makushita #18; 4–3	East Makushita #12; 7–0; Champion	East Jūryō #11; 8–7
1987	West Jūryō #7; 6–9	West Jūryō #11; 8–7	East Jūryō #8; 7–8	East Jūryō #10; 9–6	East Jūryō #7; 6–9	East Jūryō #10; 8–7
1988	East Jūryō #7; 8–7	East Jūryō #5; 7–8	East Jūryō #7; 8–7	West Jūryō #3; 7–8	West Jūryō #4; 4–11	East Jūryō #13; 8–7
1989	East Jūryō #9; 8–7	West Jūryō #6; 8–7	West Jūryō #2; 9–6	East Maegashira #14; 4–11	West Jūryō #5; 6–9	East Jūryō #10; 8–7
1990	West Jūryō #5; 5–10	West Jūryō #10; 10–5–P	West Jūryō #2; 5–10	West Jūryō #7; 8–7	West Jūryō #4; 6–9	East Jūryō #8; 7–8
1991	West Jūryō #9; Retired; 2–13	x	x	x	x	x
Record given as wins–losses–absences Top division champion Top division runner-up Retired Lower divisions Non-participation Sanshō key: F=Fighting spirit; O=Outstanding performance; T=Technique Also shown: ★=Kinboshi; P=Playoff(s); Divisions: Makuuchi — Jūryō — Makushita — Sandanme — Jonidan — Jonokuchi Makuuchi ranks: Yokozuna — Ōzeki — Sekiwake — Komusubi — Maegashira

== See also ==
- Glossary of sumo terms
- List of past sumo wrestlers
