= Shikishima Katsumori =

Sumo wrestler

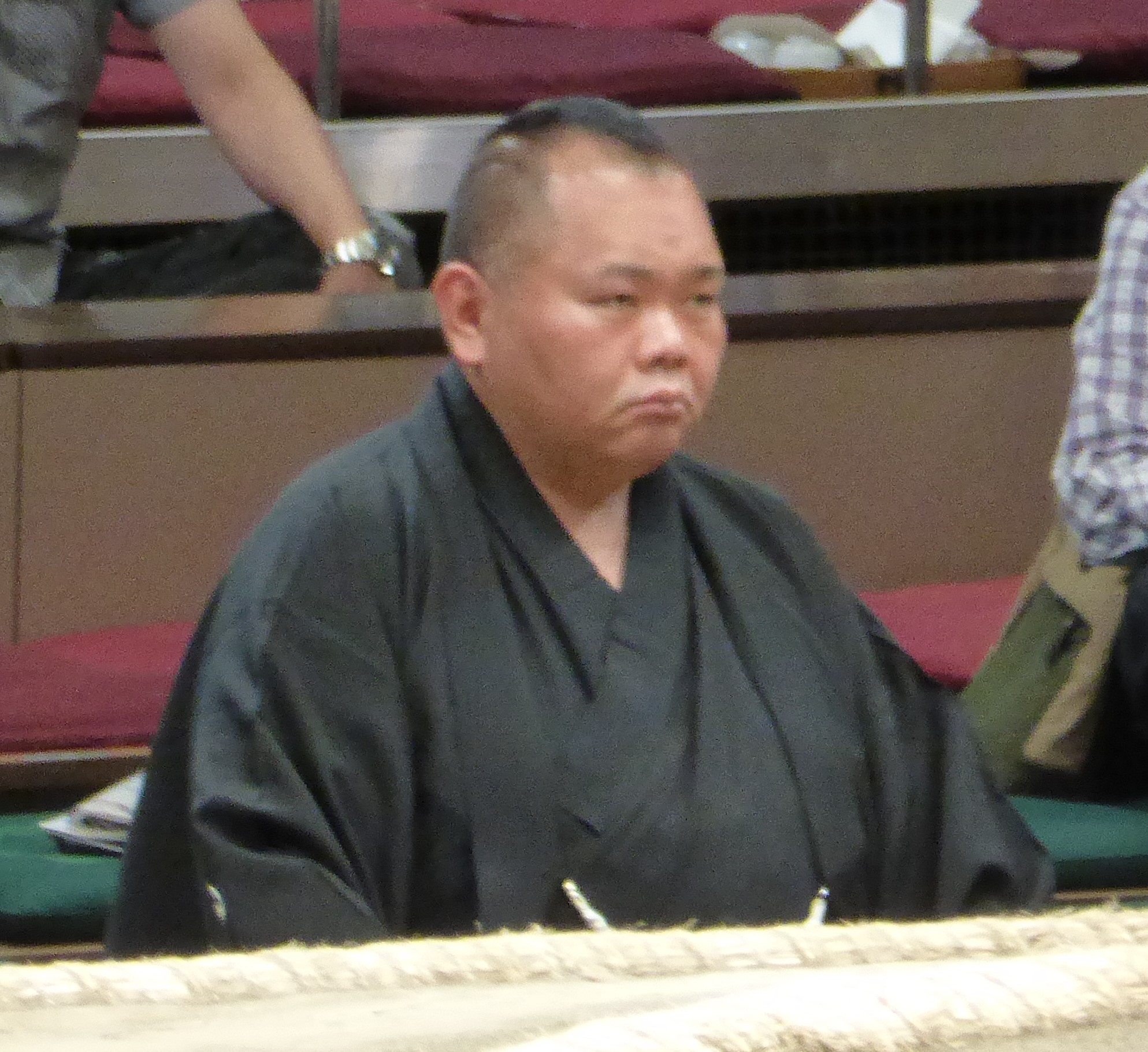

Personal information
- Native name: 敷島 勝盛
- Born: Hiromichi Yoshitane; 15 December 1970 (age 55) Funabashi, Chiba, Japan
- Height: 1.83 m (6 ft 0 in)
- Weight: 183 kg (403 lb)

Sport
- Sport: Sumo
- Retired: May, 2001
- Heya: Tatsutagawa → Michinoku
- Record: 416-418-38
- Debut: January, 1989
- Highest rank: Maegashira 1 (March, 1998)
- Elder name: Urakaze
- Championships: 1 (Jūryō); 1 (Makushita)
- Gold Stars: 2 (Takanohana II)
- Updated on Aug 2021

Shikishima Katsumori (born 15 December 1970 as Hiromichi Yoshitane) is a former sumo wrestler from Funabashi, Chiba, Japan. He made his professional debut in January 1989, and reached the top division in November 1994. His highest rank was maegashira 1. He defeated Takanohana twice in 1998 to earn his only two kinboshi for a yokozuna upset. His stablemaster, former sekiwake Aonosato retired in November 2000 and he moved from Tatsutagawa stable to Michinoku stable. He retired in May 2001 after being diagnosed with a heart ailment, and has remained in sumo as an elder of the Japan Sumo Association and coach at Michinoku. He has borrowed a succession of elder names since his retirement. Since 2013 he has been known as Urakaze.

== Career ==
He did judo while at high school, joining Tatsutagawa stable in January 1989 just before graduating. Following him into the stable two months later was the future maegashira Toyozakura. He initially fought under his own surname of Yoshitane. Progressing up through the lower divisions he stalled for a time after his makushita debut, falling back to sandanme, but he won the makushita division championship or yūshō in January 1992 with a perfect 7–0 record. In May 1993 he won promotion to jūryō, about four years after his professional debut. To mark his ascension to sekitori status he was given the new shikona of Shikishima. His first jūryō tournament was unsuccessful, as a 3–12 record sent him back to makushita, but he returned to the second division after the September 1993 tournament and in March 1994 won the jūryō championship with a 12–3 record. In November of the same year he reached the top makuuchi division for the first time, but he moved back and forth between the two divisions before finally establishing himself as a makuuchi regular after the May 1996 tournament.

In March 1998 he reached what was to be his highest career ranking of maegashira 1, and earned his first kinboshi for a yokozuna upset on the fourth day when he defeated Takanohana. His second and final kinboshi came in the next tournament with another defeat of Takanohana. However despite appearing in makuuchi for 28 tournaments, he was never able to reach the sanyaku ranks. His overall win rate in makuuchi was around 43 percent, with 175 wins against 228 losses, compared to an overall career win rate of just under 50 percent (416 wins against 418 losses). In July 2000 he lost his top division status when he could score only 3–12 at maegashira 12.

In November 2000 his stablemaster, the former Aonosato, reached the mandatory retirement age of 65, and Tatsutagawa stable closed. Shikishima and his stablemates moved to Michinoku stable, from the same ichimon or stable grouping of Tokitsukaze. In January 2001, ranked at jūryō 5, he had to withdraw on just the second day due to a cardiac function disorder, which was so serious he risked death if he continued to compete. He was forced to miss the rest of that tournament and all of the next, falling to the lower end of the makushita division. By May 2001 his condition had recovered to the point where he could live without problems in daily life, but he decided not to risk competing again and announced his retirement.

== Retirement from sumo ==
In his retirement press conference Shikishima said that he had been told he had an enlarged heart, and that he did not want to die young like fellow wrestlers Kenkō and Daishōhō. He said he had lost 30 kilograms (66 lb) in a month and urged active rikishi to learn from his mistakes and not overeat or overdrink. He began his career as an elder or toshiyori of the Japan Sumo Association under his old fighting name of Shikishima, but in January became the 14th Tatsutagawa, although the real owner of the name was his former stablemate Minatofuji. After the lifting on the ban of borrowing elder names, he vacated Tatsutagawa and went through a succession of others, becoming Fujigane, Nishikijima, Onogawa, Tanigawa and Ajigawa, before finally acquiring the Urakaze elder name in January 2013. He has remained working as a coach at Michinoku stable under that name since then. For a long time he was in charge of running the Kyushu tournament in November of each year, but retired from those duties in 2013. From May 2014 he has served on the judging committee, and received a promotion in the Sumo Association's hierarchy in May 2016 from toshiyori class to iin class.

== Fighting style ==
Shikishima was a yotsu-sumo wrestler, who preferring grappling techniques rather than pushing or thrusting. His favoured grip on his opponent's mawashi was hidari-yotsu, a right hand outside, left hand inside position. His most common winning kimarite was yori-kiri, a straightforward force-out.

== Career record ==
Shikishima Katsumori
Year	January Hatsu basho, Tokyo	March Haru basho, Osaka	May Natsu basho, Tokyo	July Nagoya basho, Nagoya	September Aki basho, Tokyo	November Kyūshū basho, Fukuoka
1989	(Maezumo)	West Jonokuchi #32; 6–1–P	East Jonidan #90; 5–2	West Jonidan #47; 4–3	West Jonidan #21; 3–4	East Jonidan #40; 4–3
1990	West Jonidan #10; 4–3	East Sandanme #80; 4–3	West Sandanme #60; 5–2	East Sandanme #27; 6–1	East Makushita #50; 2–5	West Sandanme #12; 2–5
1991	West Sandanme #36; 5–2	East Sandanme #11; 3–4	West Sandanme #28; 5–2	East Sandanme #3; 4–3	East Makushita #49; 3–4	East Makushita #56; 4–3
1992	West Makushita #46; 7–0; Champion	East Makushita #5; 2–5	East Makushita #19; 2–5	East Makushita #31; 4–3	East Makushita #25; 5–2	West Makushita #14; 4–3
1993	East Makushita #8; 6–1	West Makushita #1; 4–3	West Jūryō #13; 3–12	East Makushita #10; 6–1	East Makushita #1; 4–3	West Jūryō #12; 8–7
1994	East Jūryō #8; 6–9	West Jūryō #11; 12–3; Champion	East Jūryō #3; 7–8	West Jūryō #5; 9–6	West Jūryō #3; 9–6	East Maegashira #16; 5–10
1995	West Jūryō #4; 9–6	West Jūryō #2; 10–5–P	East Maegashira #16; 7–8	West Jūryō #3; 8–7	West Jūryō #1; 5–10	East Jūryō #6; 9–6
1996	West Jūryō #3; 8–7	West Jūryō #1; 10–5	East Maegashira #15; 10–5	East Maegashira #11; 6–9	West Maegashira #14; 8–7	West Maegashira #11; 7–8
1997	East Maegashira #15; 9–6	West Maegashira #11; 8–7	West Maegashira #7; 6–9	West Maegashira #10; 8–7	East Maegashira #7; 6–9	West Maegashira #10; 8–7
1998	East Maegashira #7; 8–7	West Maegashira #1; 3–12 ★	West Maegashira #6; 8–7 ★	West Maegashira #3; 4–9–2	West Maegashira #7; Sat out due to injury 0–0–15	East Maegashira #7; 7–8
1999	East Maegashira #8; 9–6	West Maegashira #2; 1–14	West Maegashira #11; 8–7	West Maegashira #7; 8–7	East Maegashira #4; 3–12	West Maegashira #10; 8–7
2000	East Maegashira #5; 7–8	East Maegashira #6; 4–11	West Maegashira #10; 6–9	West Maegashira #12; 3–12	East Jūryō #5; 8–7	East Jūryō #4; 7–8
2001	West Jūryō #5; 0–2–13	West Makushita #3; Sat out due to injury 0–0–7	West Makushita #43; Retired; 0–0–1	x	x	x
Record given as wins–losses–absences Top division champion Top division runner-up Retired Lower divisions Non-participation Sanshō key: F=Fighting spirit; O=Outstanding performance; T=Technique Also shown: ★=Kinboshi; P=Playoff(s); Divisions: Makuuchi — Jūryō — Makushita — Sandanme — Jonidan — Jonokuchi Makuuchi ranks: Yokozuna — Ōzeki — Sekiwake — Komusubi — Maegashira

== See also ==
- Glossary of sumo terms
- List of sumo tournament second division champions
- List of past sumo wrestlers
- List of sumo elders
