= Hoshitango Imachi =

Argentine-born Japanese sumo wrestler and professional wrestler

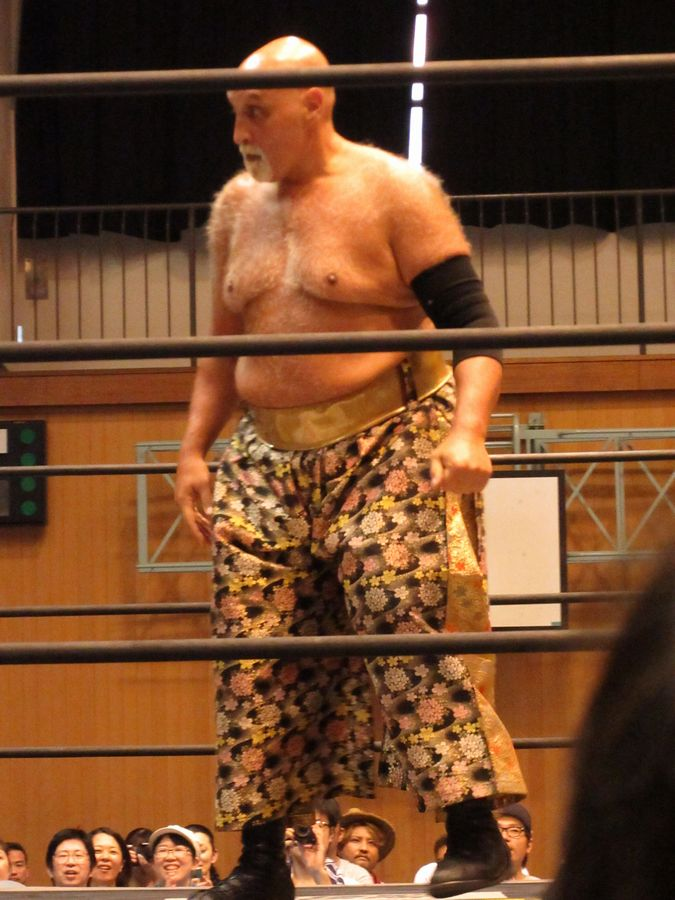
- Imachi in 2016

Personal information
- Native name: 星誕期 偉真智
- Born: Imachi Marcelo Salomón; 5 September 1965 (age 61) Buenos Aires, Argentina
- Height: 1.84 m (6 ft 1/2 in)
- Weight: 167 kg (368 lb)

Sport
- Sport: Sumo
- Retired: January, 2004
- Heya: Michinoku
- Record: 430-388-11
- Debut: May, 1987
- Highest rank: Jūryō 3 (January, 2000)
- Updated on July 2007

Hoshitango Imachi (星誕期 偉真智; born Imachi Marcelo Salomón; 5 September 1965) is an Argentine-born Japanese former professional sumo wrestler and professional wrestler. His highest rank was jūryō 3.

== Life and career ==
A former swimming instructor, Salomón was spotted by a visiting Japanese coach at a gym in Buenos Aires who encouraged him to try sumo. After studying at Chuo University, he joined Michinoku stable in May 1987 at the age of 21 to support his family. He was the first, and to date only, Jewish professional sumo wrestler. He was given the shikona (ring name) of Hoshitango, with "Hoshi" (star) a common prefix in Michinoku stable, and "tango" a reference to the popular dance. He reached the second highest jūryō division for the first time in September 1992, but lasted only one tournament there before being demoted back to the unsalaried third makushita division. He managed another three tournaments in the second division in 1994 but once again fell back. In September 1998, at the age of 33, he demonstrated his fighting spirit by once again returning to jūryō, this time remaining for 12 straight tournaments. He was not able to break into the top makuuchi division, peaking at jūryō 3 in January 2000. In July 2000 he lost every one of his fifteen bouts and fell, once more, to the third division where he remained until his retirement in January 2004. His retirement ceremony or danpatsu-shiki was attended by around 150 people including stablemates Jūmonji and Toyozakura as well as the former Terao and Kirishima, who as his stablemaster made the final cut of his topknot.

Hoshitango was joined at Michinoku stable in 1988 by another Buenos Aires native, Hoshiandesu, who reached a highest rank of jūryō 2 before retiring in 2000.

Hoshitango became a Japanese citizen in October 2000. His Japanese name was registered as Tango Hoshi.

== Retirement from sumo ==
After retiring he opened a sports bar and restaurant called Tan & Go Dining which specialized in Japanese and South American fusion cuisine.

== Fighting style ==
Hoshitango was an oshi-sumo specialist who preferred pushing and thrusting techniques to fighting on the mawashi. His most common winning kimarite were hataki-komi (slap down), hiki-otoshi (pull down) and okuri dashi (push out from behind).

== Professional wrestling career ==
Salomón is currently a professional wrestler for the Japanese company DDT Pro-Wrestling (DDT), debuting on 29 December 2006, under his shikona Hoshitango, and has also wrestled for All Japan Pro Wrestling, Ice Ribbon and Wrestle-1. As a finishing maneuver, Hoshitango uses the Argentine backbreaker and chokeslam. Due to his age and outside activities, he is a semi-regular performer.

He won his first professional wrestling championship on 3 June 2007, when he briefly held the Ironman Heavymetalweight Championship. He had another brief reign on 5 August. On 24 January 2009, he defeated Sanshiro Takagi to win the DDT Extreme Championship. After a successful title defence against Poison Sawada Julie in March, he lost the title to Danshoku Dino in a three-way match that also included Masa Takanashi on 31 May. In 2010, Hoshitango was involved in a storyline to celebrate the 30th anniversary of Gundam. Yago Aznable (dressed in Char Aznable cosplay) and Abnormal debuted for DDT in early 2010 and proved themselves to be an annoyance to DDT owner Sanshiro Takagi. Known as the Yagō Kōkoku-gun (ヤゴウ公国軍; lit. "Principality of Yago"), Abnormal was kicked out of the group and replaced with DJ Nira and joined by Ace Pilot X. On 13 June, Hoshitango joined the group, debuting as Mobile Armour Hoshitango, dressed in Big Zam cosplay. The storyline came to a close at Ryōgoku Peter Pan 2010 when Yagō Kōkoku-gun lost a no disqualification Captain's Fall six-man tag team match.

On 3 June 2012, Hoshitango had a third brief Ironman Heavymetalweight Championship reign. On 8 July, he formed the Monster Army stable with members Antonio Honda, Daisuke Sasaki Masa Takanashi, Yasu Urano and Yuji Hino. At Budokan Peter Pan, Hoshitango competed in a "5 vs. 5 Soccer match" as part of Tonkatsu SC. The match consisted of two halves of 5 minutes each where each team tried to score the most pins by pinfall (two counts) or submission. The match ended in a 2–2 draw and was decided by an actual penalty shoot-out which saw Tonkatsu SC win 2–0. On 23 June 2013, Hoshitango, Honda and Hino won the KO-D 6-Man Tag Team Championship. They lost the titles to Danshoku Dino, Kensuke Sasaki and Makoto Oishi on 21 July. On 26 January 2014, Hoshitango briefly won the Ironman Heavymetalweight Championship for a fourth time. On 23 February, after Hoshitango, Honda and Sasaki were defeated by Mikami, Sanshiro Takagi and Toru Owashi in a six-man tag team match, Honda announced that the Monster Army had decided to disband. At Judgement 2014, Monster Army wrestled their final match together, where Hoshitango, Hino, Honda and Sasaki defeated Gorgeous Matsuno, Gota Ihashi, Sanshiro Takagi and Toru Owashi.

With his stock significantly lowered following the end of Monster Army, in 2015 he began regularly competing for the King of Dark Championship. Contrary to regular professional wrestling championships, the title is awarded to the loser of the match and is a sign of shame. As punishment for holding the title, wrestler are forced to wrestle exclusively in dark matches. On 2 April 2016, Hoshitango "won" the King of Dark Championship after losing to Seiya Morohashi. He held the dubious distinction for 22 days before "losing" the title to Gota Ihashi on 24 April.

As of 2026, he still wrestles at 60.

== Sumo career record ==
Hoshitango Imachi
Year	January Hatsu basho, Tokyo	March Haru basho, Osaka	May Natsu basho, Tokyo	July Nagoya basho, Nagoya	September Aki basho, Tokyo	November Kyūshū basho, Fukuoka
1987	x	x	(Maezumō)	West Jonokuchi #47; 6–1	East Jonidan #124; 6–1	West Jonidan #53; 4–3
1988	East Jonidan #32; 4–3	West Jonidan #6; 5–2	East Sandanme #72; 4–3	East Sandanme #51; 4–3	West Sandanme #31; 5–2	East Sandanme #3; 1–6
1989	East Sandanme #34; 4–3	East Sandanme #20; 6–1	East Makushita #45; 2–5	East Sandanme #7; 5–2	West Makushita #41; 5–2	West Makushita #21; 3–4
1990	West Makushita #28; 3–4	West Makushita #40; 5–2	East Makushita #22; 4–3	West Makushita #16; 2–1–4	West Makushita #37; Sat out due to injury 0–0–7	East Sandanme #17; 5–2
1991	West Makushita #51; 5–2	East Makushita #36; 5–2	East Makushita #18; 5–2	West Makushita #7; 2–5	West Makushita #23; 3–4	West Makushita #30; 5–2
1992	East Makushita #19; 4–3	West Makushita #12; 4–3	West Makushita #8; 5–2	West Makushita #1; 4–3	East Jūryō #12; 5–10	West Makushita #7; 3–4
1993	East Makushita #14; 2–5	West Makushita #29; 5–2	West Makushita #15; 5–2	West Makushita #7; 4–3	West Makushita #3; 4–3	East Makushita #2; 4–3
1994	West Jūryō #13; 10–5	West Jūryō #5; 5–10	East Jūryō #10; 2–13	West Makushita #10; 2–5	East Makushita #25; 6–1	East Makushita #10; 2–5
1995	West Makushita #25; 4–3	East Makushita #18; 2–5	West Makushita #33; 6–1	East Makushita #14; 5–2	West Makushita #8; 3–4	East Makushita #12; 2–5
1996	East Makushita #26; 3–4	West Makushita #41; 3–4	West Makushita #53; 3–4	East Sandanme #6; 5–2	East Makushita #43; 6–1	East Makushita #20; 3–4
1997	East Makushita #31; 5–2	West Makushita #20; 5–2	West Makushita #8; 6–1–P	East Makushita #2; 2–6	East Makushita #14; 5–2	East Makushita #7; 2–5
1998	West Makushita #22; 5–2	West Makushita #9; 4–3	West Makushita #5; 5–2	East Makushita #2; 6–1	East Jūryō #13; 9–6	West Jūryō #10; 8–7
1999	East Jūryō #9; 7–8	West Jūryō #11; 9–6	West Jūryō #7; 6–9	East Jūryō #11; 8–7	East Jūryō #10; 8–7	West Jūryō #8; 9–6
2000	West Jūryō #3; 5–10	East Jūryō #7; 6–9	West Jūryō #10; 8–7	East Jūryō #8; 0–15	East Makushita #8; 6–1	West Makushita #1; 3–4
2001	East Makushita #7; 3–4	West Makushita #13; 5–2	East Makushita #7; 3–4	East Makushita #14; 4–3	West Makushita #11; 2–5	West Makushita #23; 3–4
2002	East Makushita #34; 5–2	West Makushita #24; 3–4	West Makushita #32; 5–2	East Makushita #17; 3–4	West Makushita #25; 6–1	West Makushita #8; 2–5
2003	West Makushita #23; 3–4	West Makushita #34; 3–4	East Makushita #42; 4–3	West Makushita #34; 4–3	East Makushita #28; 3–4	West Makushita #39; 1–6
2004	West Sandanme #6; Retired; 2–5	x	x	x	x	x
Record given as wins–losses–absences Top division champion Top division runner-up Retired Non-participation Jūryō Lower divisions Sanshō key: F=Fighting spirit; O=Outstanding performance; T=Technique Also shown: ★=Kinboshi; P=Playoff(s); Divisions: Makuuchi — Jūryō — Makushita — Sandanme — Jonidan — Jonokuchi Makuuchi ranks: Yokozuna — Ōzeki — Sekiwake — Komusubi — Maegashira

== Professional wrestling championships and accomplishments ==
- Dramatic Dream Team
  - DDT Extreme Championship (1 time)
  - Ironman Heavymetalweight Championship (3 times)
  - KO-D 6-Man Tag Team Championship (1 time) – with Antonio Honda and Yuji Hino
  - King of Dark Championship (1 time)

== See also ==
- Glossary of sumo terms
- List of non-Japanese sumo wrestlers
- List of past sumo wrestlers
