= Kiyoji =

- Gender: Male

Origin
- Origin: Japanese
- Meaning: Different meanings depending on the kanji used

Kiyoji (written: 清司 or 喜代治) is a masculine Japanese given name. Notable people with the name include:

- Kagamisato Kiyoji (鏡里 喜代治) (1923–2004), Japanese sumo wrestler
- Kiyoji Ōtsuji (大辻 清司) (1923 2001), Japanese photographer
