= Sasshūnada Yasutaka =

Japanese sumo wrestler

Personal information
- Native name: 薩洲洋 康貴
- Born: Katsuyuki Yoshizaki; 7 June 1957 (age 69) Ibusuki, Kagoshima, Japan
- Height: 1.82 m (5 ft 11 1/2 in)
- Weight: 150 kg (330 lb)

Sport
- Sport: Sumo
- Retired: September, 1992
- Heya: Kimigahama → Izutsu
- Record: 545-532-7
- Debut: January, 1976
- Highest rank: Maegashira 1 (March, 1988)
- Elder name: Tatsutayama
- Championships: 1 (Jūryō); 1 (Makushita); 1 (Jonokuchi)
- Updated on Sep. 2012

Sasshūnada Yasutaka (born 7 June 1957 as Katsuyuki Yoshizaki) is a former sumo wrestler from Ibusuki, Kagoshima, Japan. He made his professional debut in January 1976, and reached the top division in September 1986. His highest rank was maegashira 1. He retired in September 1992. As of 2023 he is an elder in the Japan Sumo Association under the name Tatsutayama.

== Career ==
He was born in the southern city of Ibusuki, in the southernmost prefecture of Kyushu. He is from the same area of Japan as his more famous stablemates, Terao and Sakahoko. He had done judo at high school but decided to switch to sumo. He joined Kimigahama stable (later Izutsu stable), founded by former sekiwake Tsurugamine in January 1976. He initially fought under his own surname of Yoshizaki. He won the yūshō or tournament championship in his first appearance on the banzuke ranking sheets in the jonokuchi division with a perfect 7–0 record. However, his progress up the ranks was slow. In 1982 he was given the shikona of Sasshunada, meaning "sea of Sasshu." He finally broke into the elite sekitori ranks after the May 1984 tournament when he won the makushita division championship and was promoted to jūryō. (Terao made his juryo debut at the same time). He won the jūryō championship in September 1985 with a mere 10–5 record after beating Hidanohana in a playoff. He won promotion to the top makuuchi division after the July 1986 tournament at the age of 29, having spent ten years in sumo.

Sasshūnada was one of five men from Izutsu stable in the top division simultaneously, the others being Terao, Sakahoko, Kirishima and Jingaku. However, he was unable to make much of an impression on the top ranked wrestlers and lacked the fighting spirit of some his stablemates. He never managed to defeat a yokozuna or win a special prize in his 19 tournaments ranked in the top division, and his highest rank reached was maegashira 1 in March 1988. In September 1989 his three-year stay in makuuchi ended when he scored only 5–10 at maegashira 14, and he was demoted to jūryō where he was to spend the remainder of his career.

== Retirement from sumo ==
Sasshūnada's last tournament was in July 1992, and he chose to retire rather than compete in the makushita division in September. He had not missed a single bout in his career, fighting 1077 consecutive matches. He became an elder of the Sumo Association, working as a coach at Izutsu stable. Unable to purchase elder stock at first, he borrowed a succession of different elder names before acquiring the Tatsutayama name in 1998. In 2005 he transferred from Izutsu stable to work at Michinoku stable, run by his former stablemate Kirishima. He reached the normal retirement age for an elder of 65 in June 2022, but was re-employed for a further five years as a consultant.

== Fighting style ==
Keeping with the reputation of his stable, Sasshūnada was known for having a very powerful pushing attack. His preferred techniques were oshidashi (push out) and hatakikomi (slap down), which together accounted for sixty percent of his career victories.

== Personal life ==
Married with one son, as a wrestler Sasshūnada was fond of visiting pachinko parlours in his spare time.

== Career record ==
Sasshūnada Yasutaka
Year	January Hatsu basho, Tokyo	March Haru basho, Osaka	May Natsu basho, Tokyo	July Nagoya basho, Nagoya	September Aki basho, Tokyo	November Kyūshū basho, Fukuoka
1976	(Maezumo)	West Jonokuchi #18; 7–0; Champion	East Jonidan #36; 4–3	West Jonidan #14; 5–2	East Sandanme #72; 3–4	West Sandanme #87; 6–1
1977	West Sandanme #40; 3–4	West Sandanme #5; 5–2	East Sandanme #14; 3–4	East Sandanme #26; 4–3	West Sandanme #14; 3–4	West Sandanme #24; 5–2
1978	West Sandanme #2; 2–5	West Sandanme #23; 2–5	East Sandanme #47; 4–3	East Sandanme #30; 5–2	East Makushita #59; 4–3	East Makushita #50; 3–4
1979	East Sandanme #2; 3–4	West Sandanme #15; 3–4	West Sandanme #27; 4–3	West Sandanme #16; 4–3	West Sandanme #7; 6–1	East Makushita #39; 4–3
1980	East Makushita #30; 3–4	East Makushita #41; 3–4	West Makushita #51; 6–1	West Makushita #22; 5–2	East Makushita #12; 3–4	East Makushita #20; 1–6
1981	West Makushita #43; 5–2	East Makushita #27; 4–3	East Makushita #16; 2–5	East Makushita #32; 4–3	West Makushita #24; 3–4	East Makushita #31; 5–2
1982	West Makushita #16; 5–2	West Makushita #6; 3–4	West Makushita #12; 3–4	East Makushita #9; 1–6	East Makushita #34; 5–2	East Makushita #18; 4–3
1983	West Makushita #10; 3–4	West Makushita #18; 4–3	West Makushita #12; 3–4	West Makushita #18; 4–3	East Makushita #13; 3–4	East Makushita #20; 4–3
1984	East Makushita #12; 2–5	West Makushita #28; 5–2	East Makushita #12; 7–0; Champion	East Jūryō #11; 8–7	East Jūryō #8; 8–7	West Jūryō #6; 9–6
1985	West Jūryō #5; 9–6	West Jūryō #1; 7–8	West Jūryō #3; 9–6	West Jūryō #2; 7–8	East Jūryō #4; 10–5–P; Champion	West Jūryō #1; 6–9
1986	East Jūryō #6; 7–8	West Jūryō #8; 8–7	East Jūryō #6; 10–5	West Jūryō #1; 10–5	West Maegashira #11; 8–7	East Maegashira #6; 6–9
1987	East Maegashira #11; 8–7	West Maegashira #7; 6–9	West Maegashira #11; 8–7	East Maegashira #6; 5–10	East Maegashira #13; 9–6	West Maegashira #5; 7–8
1988	East Maegashira #6; 9–6	West Maegashira #1; 4–11	East Maegashira #10; 8–7	West Maegashira #5; 7–8	East Maegashira #6; 6–9	West Maegashira #9; 8–7
1989	West Maegashira #4; 4–11	East Maegashira #10; 7–8	West Maegashira #11; 8–7	East Maegashira #9; 6–9	East Maegashira #14; 5–10	East Jūryō #7; 8–7
1990	West Jūryō #2; 9–6	East Jūryō #1; 5–10	East Jūryō #6; 6–9	West Jūryō #10; 9–6	West Jūryō #5; 7–8	West Jūryō #6; 9–6
1991	East Jūryō #2; 6–9	West Jūryō #6; 7–8	West Jūryō #8; 8–7	West Jūryō #6; 5–10	East Jūryō #10; 7–8	West Jūryō #11; 8–7
1992	West Jūryō #7; 7–8	West Jūryō #8; 5–10	West Makushita #1; 5–2	East Jūryō #11; 4–11	West Makushita #7; Retired; 0–0–7	x
Record given as wins–losses–absences Top division champion Top division runner-up Retired Lower divisions Non-participation Sanshō key: F=Fighting spirit; O=Outstanding performance; T=Technique Also shown: ★=Kinboshi; P=Playoff(s); Divisions: Makuuchi — Jūryō — Makushita — Sandanme — Jonidan — Jonokuchi Makuuchi ranks: Yokozuna — Ōzeki — Sekiwake — Komusubi — Maegashira

== See also ==
- Glossary of sumo terms
- List of past sumo wrestlers
- List of sumo elders
- List of sumo tournament second division champions
