= Ōuchiyama Heikichi =

Japanese sumo wrestler (1926–1985)

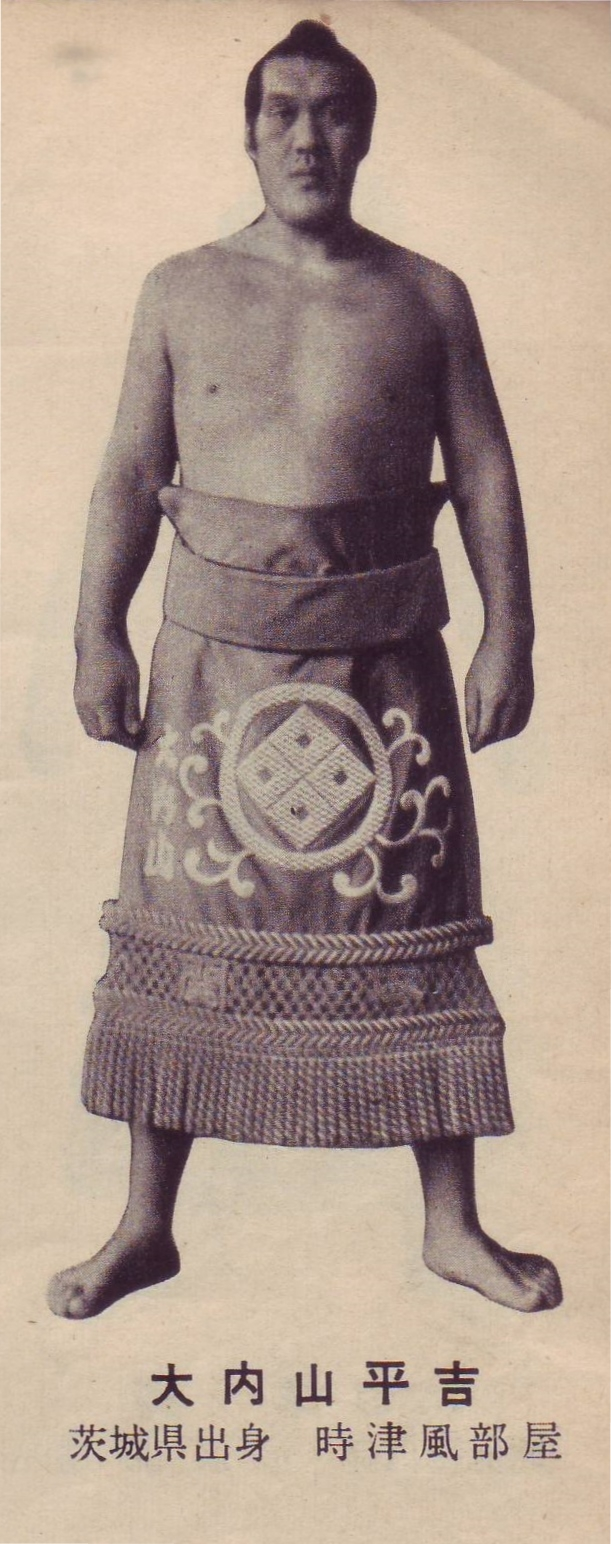

Personal information
- Native name: 大内山 平吉
- Born: Heikichi Ōuchi; 19 June 1926 Hitachinaka, Ibaraki, Japan
- Died: 1 November 1985 (aged 59)
- Height: 2.02 m (6 ft 7 1/2 in)
- Weight: 153 kg (337 lb)

Sport
- Sport: Sumo
- Retired: March 1959
- Heya: Tokitsukaze
- Record: 347–278–53
- Debut: January 1944
- Highest rank: Ōzeki (May 1955)
- Elder name: Tatsutayama
- Championships: 1 (Makushita)
- Special Prizes: Outstanding Performance (1)
- Gold Stars: 2 (Chiyonoyama, Tochinishiki)
- Updated on June 2020

Ōuchiyama Heikichi (大内山 平吉; 19 June 1926 – 1 November 1985; born Heikichi Ōuchi) was a sumo wrestler from Hitachinaka, Ibaraki, Japan. He made his professional debut in 1944, and reached the top makuuchi division in 1949. He reached the second highest rank of ōzeki in 1955, and was a runner-up in two tournaments. He was well known for his extraordinary size – at 2.02 m (6 ft 7 1/2 in) tall he was the tallest modern era ōzeki until Akebono in 1992. After his retirement in 1959 he worked as a coach at Tokitsukaze stable and Tatsutagawa stable until his death in 1985.

== Career ==
Ōuchiyama came from a fishing family, and helped out on the fishing boats by diving into the water to catch fish. He was not particularly large in elementary school, but increased rapidly in height after that. During the war he was recruited by the Imperial Japanese Navy, assigned to the anti-submarine patrol unit with his father. He joined Futabayama stable (later Tokitsukaze stable) in 1944 and reached the jūryō division in 1947. He was promoted to top makuuchi division in 1949. In his debut tournament at komusubi in May 1951 he was the only man to defeat tournament winner Chiyonoyama, who was promoted to yokozuna after the tournament. Ōuchiyama defeated him again in May 1952, this time ranked as a maegashira, and earned his first kinboshi or gold star. After finishing as runner-up to Chiyonoyama with a 13–2 record in March 1955 (Chiyonoyama defeated him in a playoff for the championship) he was promoted to sumo's second highest rank of ōzeki. His promotion was helped by the fact that the only ōzeki at the time, Mitsuneyama, was struggling with injury and was demoted shortly afterwards. He was chosen ahead of his sekiwake rival Matsunobori, who was also challenging for promotion. He was the first ōzeki over 2 metres tall since the so-called kanban or "guest ōzeki" of the Edo period who were only listed on the banzuke to draw crowds to tournaments. He was said to have broken the jinx that wrestlers who are too big do not win promotion.

Ōuchiyama's ōzeki career began well, with a memorable bout on the final day of the May 1955 tournament against Tochinishiki which went to a re-match, and an 11–4 record in the September 1955 tournament won by his stablemate Kagamisato. However he injured his foot in January 1956 and was also hampered by acromegaly and diabetes. He managed to stay at ōzeki for only eight tournaments in total, as two consecutive make-koshi or losing scores saw him demoted from the rank after the January 1957 tournament. He was unfortunate in that the tournament in which he was kadoban he had to withdraw shortly before his match on Day 5 due to injuring his knee doing shiko stamps in the training area. He was the only yokozuna or ōzeki since 1950 to have won only one sanshō in his career – the Outstanding Performance prize in the tournament that led to his promotion. He did not get a Fighting Spirit Prize in March 1953 despite a 12–3 record as a maegashira. This was because the makuuchi division was a great deal larger in his time and maegashira wrestlers fought largely amongst themselves and did not face yokozuna or ōzeki. There was also no sharing of prizes amongst more than one wrestler in those days.

Ōuchiyama fought in the maegashira ranks until his retirement in 1959, getting another kinboshi for defeating Tochinishiki in May 1957 (a rare example of a former ozeki winning a kinboshi). He came back from a knee injury to produce another runner-up performance in the January 1958 tournament.

== Retirement from sumo ==
He became an elder of the Japan Sumo Association, working as a coach at his old stable. He was initially known as Shikoroyama Oyakata, and then Tatsutayama Oyakata from 1961. He accompanied his old stablemate Kagamisato when he left Tokitsukaze stable in 1971 to found Tatsutagawa stable. He also worked as a judge of tournament bouts, and it was remarked upon that audience members seated directly behind him would miss most of the action. In his later years he also operated a chankonabe restaurant named "Ōuchi". It was later taken over by his son and has been featured in the TV series Kodoku no Gourmet.

He continued to work at Tatsutagawa stable until his death from a brain tumour at the age of 59 in November 1985. The stable was small, and had been unable to produce a sekitori since its founding, but Takamichi eventually did reach juryo in March 1987, 14 months after Ōuchiyama's death.

== Fighting style ==
As well as his great height Ōuchiyama was known for his strong and flexible legs, and his speed. His most common winning kimarite were yori kiri (force out), yori taoshi (force out and down), kotenage (armlock throw) and uwatenage (overarm throw).

== Pre-modern career record ==
- Through most of the 1940s only two tournaments were held a year, and in 1946 only one was held. The New year tournament began and the Spring tournament returned to Osaka in 1953.

Ōuchiyama Heikichi
-	Spring Haru basho, Tokyo	Summer Natsu basho, Tokyo	Autumn Aki basho, Tokyo
1944	(Maezumo)	East Jonokuchi #4; 3–2	East Jonidan #37; 4–1
1945	Not held	East Sandanme #26; 4–1	East Makushita #23; 3–2
1946	Not held	Not held	East Makushita #15; 3–4
1947	Not held	West Makushita #23; 5–0; Champion	East Jūryō #13; 7–4
1948	Not held	East Jūryō #5; 7–4	West Jūryō #1; 7–4
1949	East Maegashira #17; 9–4	West Maegashira #9; 9–6	East Maegashira #5; 6–9
1950	West Maegashira #7; 9–6	West Maegashira #5; 8–7	West Maegashira #2; 5–10
1951	East Maegashira #5; 10–5	West Komusubi #1; 10–5	East Sekiwake #1; 9–6
1952	West Sekiwake #1; 6–9	West Maegashira #1; 11–4 ★	East Sekiwake #2; 4–11
Record given as wins–losses–absences Top division champion Top division runner-up Retired Lower divisions Non-participation Sanshō key: F=Fighting spirit; O=Outstanding performance; T=Technique Also shown: ★=Kinboshi; P=Playoff(s); Divisions: Makuuchi — Jūryō — Makushita — Sandanme — Jonidan — Jonokuchi Makuuchi ranks: Yokozuna — Ōzeki — Sekiwake — Komusubi — Maegashira

-	New Year Hatsu basho, Tokyo	Spring Haru basho, Osaka	Summer Natsu basho, Tokyo	Autumn Aki basho, Tokyo
1953	West Maegashira #1; Sat out due to injury 0–0–15	East Maegashira #9; Sat out due to injury 0–0–15	West Maegashira #17; 12–3	East Maegashira #9; 9–6
1954	West Maegashira #3; 9–6	West Komusubi #1; 10–5	West Sekiwake #1; 9–4–2	East Sekiwake #1; 9–6
1955	West Sekiwake #1; 11–4	East Sekiwake #1; 13–2; O	East Ōzeki #1; 9–6	East Ōzeki #1; 11–4
1956	East Ōzeki #1; 6–9	West Ōzeki #1; 10–5	West Ōzeki #1; 10–5	West Ōzeki #1; 7–8
Record given as wins–losses–absences Top division champion Top division runner-up Retired Lower divisions Non-participation Sanshō key: F=Fighting spirit; O=Outstanding performance; T=Technique Also shown: ★=Kinboshi; P=Playoff(s); Divisions: Makuuchi — Jūryō — Makushita — Sandanme — Jonidan — Jonokuchi Makuuchi ranks: Yokozuna — Ōzeki — Sekiwake — Komusubi — Maegashira

== Modern career record ==
- Since the addition of the Kyushu tournament in 1957 and the Nagoya tournament in 1958, the yearly schedule has remained unchanged.

Year	January Hatsu basho, Tokyo	March Haru basho, Osaka	May Natsu basho, Tokyo	July Nagoya basho, Nagoya	September Aki basho, Tokyo	November Kyūshū basho, Fukuoka
1957	East Ōzeki #2; 2–3–10	East Sekiwake #2; 5–10	East Maegashira #1; 7–8 ★	Not held	West Maegashira #2; 6–9	East Maegashira #4; 2–6–7
1958	East Maegashira #14; 12–3	West Maegashira #2; 6–9	West Maegashira #4; 4–11	West Maegashira #8; 8–7	West Maegashira #6; 8–7	West Maegashira #3; 2–9–4
1959	West Maegashira #13; 4–11	West Maegashira #19; Retired; 7–8	x	x	x	x
Record given as wins–losses–absences Top division champion Top division runner-up Retired Lower divisions Non-participation Sanshō key: F=Fighting spirit; O=Outstanding performance; T=Technique Also shown: ★=Kinboshi; P=Playoff(s); Divisions: Makuuchi — Jūryō — Makushita — Sandanme — Jonidan — Jonokuchi Makuuchi ranks: Yokozuna — Ōzeki — Sekiwake — Komusubi — Maegashira

== See also ==
- Glossary of sumo terms
- List of past sumo wrestlers
- List of ōzeki
