= Tatsutagawa stable =

Defunct sumo stable

Tatsutagawa stable (立田川部屋, Tatsutagawa-beya) (1971–2000) was a sumo stable of the Tokitsukaze group.

== History ==
The stable was founded in 1971 by the former yokozuna Kagamisato. He had become head coach of the Tokitsukaze stable in 1968 upon the death of the previous stablemaster, Futabayama, but was forced out because Futabayama's widow (who retained the rights of the stable and its premises) wanted the former ōzeki Yutakayama Katsuo in charge instead. Kagamisato took the elder name of Tatsutagawa (which had previously been used by several gyōji but had remained vacant since 1961) and set up the stable without taking any recruits with him from Tokitsukaze stable. He was joined by Tatsutayama Oyakata, the former ōzeki Ouchiyama, who worked as a coach at the new stable until his death in 1985. The stable was unable to attract many promising wrestlers and Kagamisato reached the Japan Sumo Association's mandatory retirement age of 65 in April 1988 without having produced any top division wrestlers, and just one sekitori, Takamichi, who reached a highest rank of jūryō 9.

Following Kagamisato's retirement the stable was taken over by the former sekiwake Aonosato who moved from the parent Tokitsukaze stable. He produced the sekitori Fukunosato, Shikishima, Jūmonji and Ryūhō. The stable folded upon Aonosato's retirement in November 2000 upon reaching 65 years of age, with the remaining wrestlers and personnel transferring to Michinoku stable. Among them were future top division wrestlers Toyozakura and Hakuba.

== Owner ==
- 1988–2000 14th Tatsutagawa: (sekiwake, Aonosato)
- 1968–1988 13th Tatsutagawa: (42nd yokozuna, Kagamisato)

== Notable wrestlers ==
- Hakuba (komusubi)
- Shikishima (maegashira 1)
- Toyozakura (maegashira 5)
- Jūmonji ( maegashira 6)
- Ryūhō (maegashira 16)
- Takamichi (jūryō 9)
- Fukunosato (jūryō 13)

== See also ==
- List of sumo stables
- List of sumo elders
- List of active sumo wrestlers
- List of past sumo wrestlers
- List of years in sumo
- Glossary of sumo terms
