= Ryūhō Masayoshi =

Japanese sumo wrestler (born 1977)

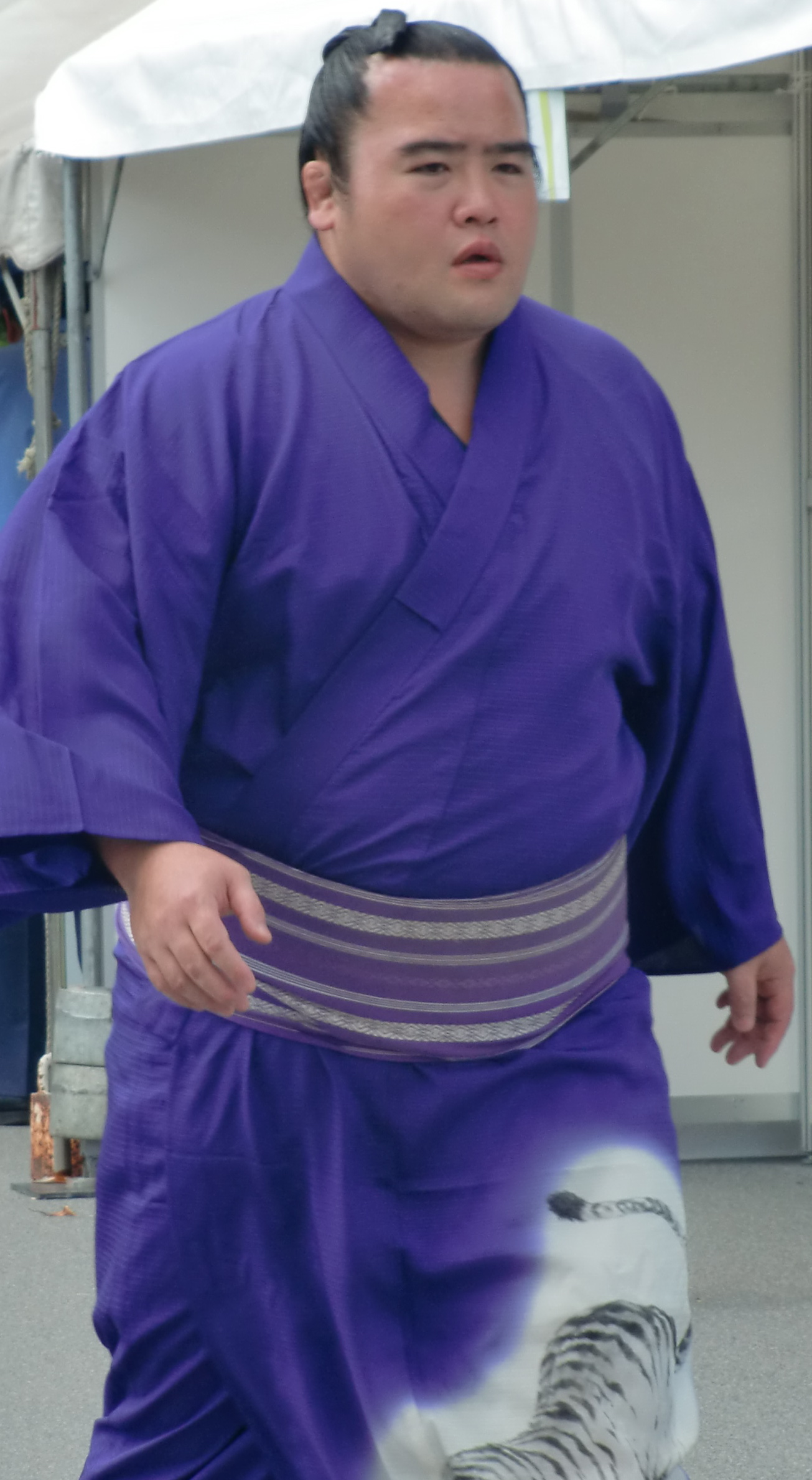

Personal information
- Native name: 琉鵬 正吉
- Born: Keisuke Urazaki; June 18, 1977 (age 49) Okinawa, Japan
- Height: 1.84 m (6 ft 1/2 in)
- Weight: 147 kg (324 lb; 23.1 st)

Sport
- Sport: Sumo
- Retired: June, 2012
- Heya: Tatsutagawa → Michinoku
- Record: 444-427-55
- Debut: March, 1993
- Highest rank: Maegashira 16 (September, 2006)
- Updated on Feb 2015

Ryūhō Masayoshi (born June 18, 1977 as Keisuke Urazaki) is a former sumo wrestler from Nakagami, Okinawa, Japan. His highest rank was maegashira 16.

== Career ==
He entered sumo in March 1993, joining Tatsutagawa stable. He initially wrestled under his own surname of Urazaki, first adopting the shikona of Ryūhō in 1997. He changed the second part of his shikona several times, from Keisuke to Shokichi before settling on Masayoshi.

In 2000 he moved to Michinoku stable when his old heya was closed down upon the retirement of its stablemaster. After over nine years in the unsalaried apprentice ranks, he finally became a sekitori for the first time in November 2002 upon promotion to the second highest jūryō division. He could only manage a 5-10 score in that tournament and was demoted back to the makushita division. He finally managed a return to jūryō in September 2005, after nearly three years away, and slowly moved up the division until an 8-7 score at jūryō 1 in July 2006 saw him promoted to the top makuuchi division. It took him 81 tournaments from his professional debut to reach makuuchi, which at the time was the tenth slowest since the introduction of the six tournaments a year system in 1958.

Although Ryūhō won his first two top division matches (against Kasugao and Kakuryū) he could manage only two more wins in September 2006 (against Hakurozan and Toyonoshima) and was demoted back to the second division after only one tournament. By July 2007 he had fallen to jūryō 11 and a loss to Ichihara on Day 12 left him with only three wins against nine losses. Demotion to makushita seemed certain, yet he managed to win his last three bouts, and his 6-9 score was just enough to preserve his sekitori status. However, in the next tournament in September 2007 he could only manage 5-10 at jūryō 14 and was demoted from jūryō, replaced by Ichihara.

Back in makushita for the November 2007 tournament he turned in a make-koshi 3-4 score. He produced three kachi-koshi winning records of 4-3 in the first three tournaments of 2008, but partly due to knee problems, this was followed by three straight make-koshi. In 2009 he achieved six straight winning records, bringing him to the verge of promotion back to jūryō. Despite faltering in January and May 2010, a 6-1 record at makushita 11 in July 2010 was enough to return him to sekitori level for the first time in 18 tournaments. Benefiting from the large number of demotions from jūryō because of suspensions, he became the first wrestler since the instigation of the seven-day tournament system for the lower ranks in July 1960 to be promoted to jūryō from below makushita 10 without a perfect 7-0 record. Ryūhō described his promotion as a "miracle." Despite losing on the final day of the September tournament to the makushita wrestler Tsurugidake to finish with a make-koshi score of 7-8 he remained in jūryō for the following tournament. However, in November 2010 he could only score 4-11 at the lowest jūryō rank.

== Retirement from sumo ==
Ryūhō withdrew from the May 2011 tournament with only one win, the first time since January 2000 that he missed any matches. He did not return to the dohyō again and dropped to the sandanme division in September, then jonidan in January 2012, and jonokuchi in May 2012. His rank of jonokuchi 4 in May was the lowest ever held by a former top division wrestler. Ryūhō finally announced his retirement on 12 June 2012, citing persistent knee and lower back injuries. His retirement ceremony (and wedding reception) was held on 30 September 2012 at a Tokyo hotel with around 200 guests. Since his retirement he has been involved in organizing amateur sumo in his native Okinawa prefecture, and has become a Zen Buddhist monk. He is unable to bend his left knee because of the injury sustained in his sumo career.

== Fighting style ==
Ryūhō was a solidly yotsu-sumo wrestler and nearly half his victories came by using the most common kimarite of yori kiri or force out. He preferred a hidari-yotsu, or right hand outside, left hand inside grip on his opponent's mawashi.

== Career record ==
Ryūhō Masayoshi
Year	January Hatsu basho, Tokyo	March Haru basho, Osaka	May Natsu basho, Tokyo	July Nagoya basho, Nagoya	September Aki basho, Tokyo	November Kyūshū basho, Fukuoka
1993	x	(Maezumo)	West Jonokuchi #52; 5–2	East Jonidan #175; 2–5	East Jonokuchi #16; 3–4	West Jonokuchi #28; 4–3
1994	East Jonidan #172; 5–2	East Jonidan #121; 3–4	West Jonidan #142; 2–5	West Jonidan #177; 6–1	West Jonidan #83; 1–6	East Jonidan #124; 2–5
1995	West Jonidan #151; 7–0–PP	East Sandanme #95; 2–5	West Jonidan #18; 3–4	West Jonidan #32; 3–4	East Jonidan #57; 3–4	West Jonidan #75; 5–2
1996	East Jonidan #28; 5–2	West Sandanme #91; 3–4	West Jonidan #10; 3–4	East Jonidan #34; 5–2	West Sandanme #97; 5–2	West Sandanme #58; 3–4
1997	West Sandanme #73; 2–5	East Jonidan #6; 5–2	West Sandanme #68; 5–2	East Sandanme #34; 5–2	West Sandanme #7; 2–5	West Sandanme #33; 3–4
1998	West Sandanme #46; 5–2	East Sandanme #20; 4–3	West Sandanme #9; 4–3	East Makushita #59; 3–4	East Sandanme #11; 6–1	East Makushita #40; 3–4
1999	East Makushita #53; 4–3	East Makushita #43; 4–3	East Makushita #34; 3–4	West Makushita #42; 4–3	West Makushita #31; 3–4	East Makushita #38; 0–2–5
2000	East Sandanme #13; Sat out due to injury 0–0–7	East Sandanme #13; 3–4	East Sandanme #25; 5–2	West Makushita #60; 5–2	East Makushita #40; 5–2	East Makushita #21; 4–3
2001	West Makushita #16; 3–4	West Makushita #26; 3–4	East Makushita #34; 3–4	West Makushita #43; 5–2	West Makushita #27; 4–3	East Makushita #24; 2–5
2002	West Makushita #39; 4–3	East Makushita #34; 5–2	East Makushita #19; 4–3	East Makushita #13; 6–1–P	East Makushita #2; 4–3	West Jūryō #11; 5–10
2003	West Makushita #4; 2–5	West Makushita #19; 6–1	East Makushita #7; 3–4	East Makushita #12; 3–4	East Makushita #20; 5–2	East Makushita #11; 4–3
2004	East Makushita #6; 3–4	West Makushita #13; 3–4	West Makushita #21; 3–4	West Makushita #27; 4–3	West Makushita #21; 5–2	East Makushita #13; 2–5
2005	East Makushita #25; 6–1	East Makushita #10; 3–4	East Makushita #15; 5–2	East Makushita #5; 5–2	East Jūryō #13; 7–8	West Jūryō #13; 8–7
2006	East Jūryō #8; 11–4	East Jūryō #1; 5–10	West Jūryō #5; 9–6	East Jūryō #1; 8–7	East Maegashira #16; 4–11	East Jūryō #5; 7–8
2007	West Jūryō #5; 7–8	West Jūryō #7; 8–7	West Jūryō #4; 4–11	West Jūryō #11; 6–9	West Jūryō #14; 5–10	East Makushita #3; 3–4
2008	East Makushita #8; 4–3	West Makushita #5; 4–3	West Makushita #3; 4–3	East Makushita #2; 2–5	West Makushita #11; 2–5	East Makushita #25; 3–4
2009	West Makushita #35; 5–2	West Makushita #21; 4–3	East Makushita #15; 4–3	West Makushita #10; 4–3	East Makushita #6; 5–2	West Makushita #3; 4–3
2010	East Makushita #2; 2–5	East Makushita #8; 5–2	West Makushita #3; 2–5	West Makushita #11; 6–1	East Jūryō #14; 7–8	West Jūryō #14; 4–11
2011	East Makushita #7; 3–4	Tournament Cancelled; 0–0–0	East Makushita #15; 1–5–1	West Makushita #29; Sat out due to injury 0–0–7	West Sandanme #7; Sat out due to injury 0–0–7	West Sandanme #67; Sat out due to injury 0–0–7
2012	East Jonidan #28; Sat out due to injury 0–0–7	West Jonidan #98; Sat out due to injury 0–0–7	West Jonokuchi #4; Retired; 0–0–7	x	x	x
Record given as wins–losses–absences Top division champion Top division runner-up Retired Lower divisions Non-participation Sanshō key: F=Fighting spirit; O=Outstanding performance; T=Technique Also shown: ★=Kinboshi; P=Playoff(s); Divisions: Makuuchi — Jūryō — Makushita — Sandanme — Jonidan — Jonokuchi Makuuchi ranks: Yokozuna — Ōzeki — Sekiwake — Komusubi — Maegashira

== See also ==
- Glossary of sumo terms
- List of past sumo wrestlers
