= Hakuba Takeshi =

Mongolian sumo wrestler

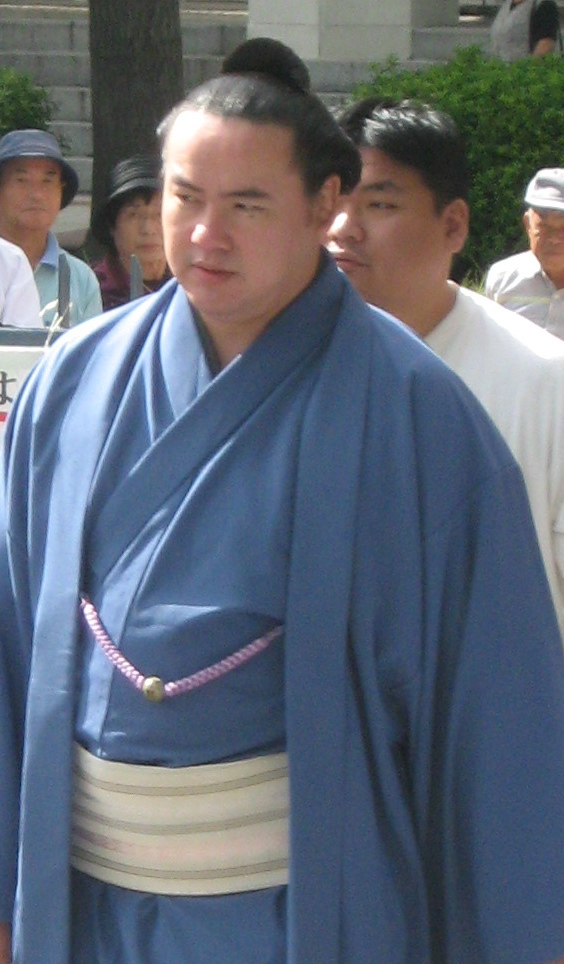
- Takeshi in 2008

Personal information
- Native name: 白馬 毅
- Born: Ariunbayar Unurjargal; May 5, 1983 (age 43) Ulan Bator, Mongolia
- Height: 1.85 m (6 ft 1 in)
- Weight: 128 kg (282 lb; 20.2 st)

Sport
- Sport: Sumo
- Retired: April 2011
- Heya: Tatsutagawa → Michinoku
- Record: 347–303–12
- Debut: January 2000
- Highest rank: Komusubi (July 2010)
- Championships: 1 (Makushita); 1 (Jonidan)
- Updated on Jan 2011

Hakuba Takeshi (白馬毅, born May 5, 1983) is a former sumo wrestler from Ulan Bator, Mongolia. Joining the professional sport in 2000, he entered the top division for the first time in 2008, returning in 2010. His highest rank was komusubi. He was forced to retire from sumo in 2011 after being found guilty by the Japan Sumo Association (JSA) of involvement in match-fixing.

== Early life and sumo background ==
Ariunbayar Unurjargal had little background in sports. However, his aunt living in Japan had an acquaintance who knew the coach of Tatsutagawa stable. He was encouraged to come to Japan and try out. The Tatsutagawa coach had originally intended for Hakuba to join another stable in the same ichimon, Michinoku, as his own stable would be disbanded upon his impending retirement. However, at the time of Hakuba's entry in January 2000, Michinoku already had its Japan Sumo Association designated limit of foreign wrestlers. Hakuba was therefore allowed to join Tatsutagawa after all, with the understanding he would join Michinoku upon Tatsutagawa being shut down, which occurred in September 2000. His shikona, or fighting name, was chosen by Michinoku's support committee and combines the character for "white", because a white star is what a winning bout is called in sumo terminology, and the character for "horse", an emotive image of Mongolia.

== Career ==
Exactly a year after entering sumo, he won the jonidan division championship or yūshō, the first his stable had had. However, after this he struggled for several years in the middle division ranks. A streak of success in 2006, culminating in the makushita championship in the last tournament of 2006, would finally grant him promotion to jūryō in January 2007. He never dropped below again, but after breaking into the top makuuchi division for the first time in May 2008 he was demoted after only one tournament. His rise to makuuchi was the second slowest for a foreigner after Sentoryū. His second appearance in makuuchi at his highest yet achieved rank of maegashira 14 was in January 2010 and he secured his kachi-koshi by Day 10, finishing on 9–6. This took him to a new highest rank to date of maegashira 9 in March. He came through with another winning record there and was promoted to maegashira 5 for the May tournament.

The May 2010 basho was Hakuba's most successful yet. He scored ten wins from his new highest rank, and defeated two ōzeki, fellow Mongolian Harumafuji (in his first bout against an ōzeki), and Kotoōshū. He was rewarded with promotion to komusubi for the July 2010 tournament, becoming the first member of the old Tatsutagawa stable to reach the titled san'yaku ranks and the first from Michinoku since the present stablemaster (former ōzeki Kirishima) took over in 1997. He could manage only four wins in his komusubi debut.

Hakuba was one of 23 wrestlers found guilty of fixing the result of bouts after an investigation by the Japan Sumo Association, and he was forced to retire in April 2011.

Since 2013 he has run a restaurant called "Ulaanbaatar" in Ryōgoku which was opened by his mother in 2008, specializing in Mongolian food.

== Fighting style ==
Hakuba was one of the lightest wrestlers in the top division, with a typical fighting weight of around 120 kg (260 lb). He was a yotsu-sumo specialist, preferring grappling techniques. His favoured grip on his opponent's mawashi was hidari-yotsu, a right hand outside, left hand inside position. His most common winning kimarite is a straightforward yori-kiri or force out. He also regularly employed both uwatenage (overarm throw) and shitatenage (underarm throw). He often used henka (side-stepping) at the tachi-ai for which he was routinely criticized.

== Personal life ==
Some tabloids in Japan had implied his romantic relationships with several female celebrities, including glamour model Nozomi Sasaki until he announced publicly in January 2010 that he had married the younger sister of fellow Mongolian rikishi Tokitenkū on October 3, 2008. The wedding ceremony took place on June 18, 2011 at Tokyo's Metropolitan Hotel, which Hakuba combined with his danpatsu-shiki or retirement ceremony. He has a daughter born in November 2008.

== Career record ==
Hakuba Takeshi
Year	January Hatsu basho, Tokyo	March Haru basho, Osaka	May Natsu basho, Tokyo	July Nagoya basho, Nagoya	September Aki basho, Tokyo	November Kyūshū basho, Fukuoka
2000	(Maezumo)	West Jonokuchi #35; 4–3	East Jonidan #130; 5–2	East Jonidan #80; 5–2	East Jonidan #37; 1–1–5	West Jonidan #72; Sat out due to injury 0–0–7
2001	East Jonidan #72; 7–0–P; Champion	West Sandanme #68; 4–3	West Sandanme #50; 4–3	East Sandanme #34; 3–4	West Sandanme #51; 4–3	West Sandanme #40; 4–3
2002	West Sandanme #27; 4–3	East Sandanme #14; 2–5	West Sandanme #40; 4–3	East Sandanme #26; 2–5	East Sandanme #51; 6–1	West Sandanme #1; 5–2
2003	West Makushita #40; 4–3	East Makushita #32; 4–3	West Makushita #26; 3–4	West Makushita #33; 3–4	East Makushita #41; 3–4	West Makushita #52; 5–2
2004	East Makushita #29; 4–3	West Makushita #21; 3–4	West Makushita #31; 3–4	West Makushita #38; 4–3	West Makushita #31; 2–5	West Makushita #45; 5–2
2005	East Makushita #30; 3–4	East Makushita #40; 5–2	East Makushita #29; 3–4	West Makushita #35; 3–4	West Makushita #46; 3–4	West Makushita #53; 6–1
2006	West Makushita #24; 6–1–P	West Makushita #9; 6–1	West Makushita #2; 3–4	West Makushita #6; 5–2	West Makushita #2; 4–3	East Makushita #2; 7–0; Champion
2007	East Jūryō #11; 8–7	West Jūryō #10; 8–7	East Jūryō #8; 7–8	West Jūryō #8; 8–7	West Jūryō #3; 8–7	West Jūryō #2; 5–10
2008	West Jūryō #8; 11–4	West Jūryō #3; 8–7	West Maegashira #16; 4–11	West Jūryō #5; 5–10	East Jūryō #11; 7–8	West Jūryō #12; 7–8
2009	East Jūryō #14; 11–4–P	East Jūryō #4; 6–9	West Jūryō #7; 8–7	West Jūryō #3; 7–8	East Jūryō #5; 9–6	West Jūryō #1; 8–7
2010	West Maegashira #14; 9–6	East Maegashira #9; 8–7	West Maegashira #5; 10–5	East Komusubi #1; 4–11	West Maegashira #5; 8–7	East Maegashira #4; 4–11
2011	West Maegashira #10; 8–7	Tournament Cancelled; 0–0–0	East Maegashira #7; Retired –	x	x	x
Record given as wins–losses–absences Top division champion Top division runner-up Retired Lower divisions Non-participation Sanshō key: F=Fighting spirit; O=Outstanding performance; T=Technique Also shown: ★=Kinboshi; P=Playoff(s); Divisions: Makuuchi — Jūryō — Makushita — Sandanme — Jonidan — Jonokuchi Makuuchi ranks: Yokozuna — Ōzeki — Sekiwake — Komusubi — Maegashira

== See also ==
- Glossary of sumo terms
- List of past sumo wrestlers
- List of Mongolian sumo wrestlers
- List of non-Japanese sumo wrestlers
- List of komusubi
