= Jūmonji Tomokazu =

Japanese sumo wrestler

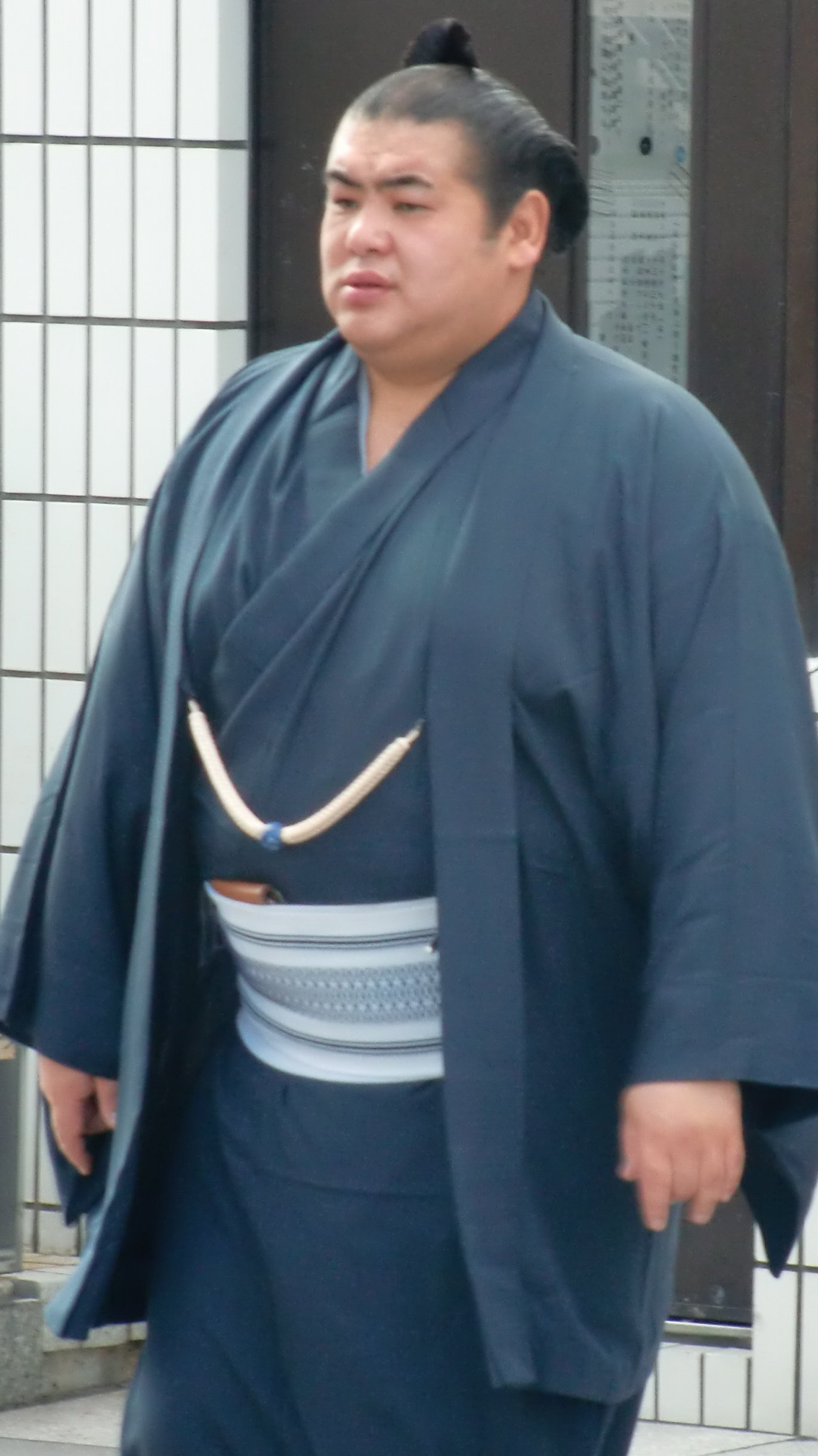

Personal information
- Native name: 十文字 友和
- Born: Tomokazu Jūmonji; 9 June 1976 (age 50) Aomori, Japan
- Height: 1.86 m (6 ft 1 in)
- Weight: 158 kg (348 lb; 24.9 st)

Sport
- Sport: Sumo
- Retired: April 2011
- Heya: Tatsutagawa → Michinoku
- Record: 596-606-17
- Debut: November 1992
- Highest rank: Maegashira 6 (July 2003)
- Championships: 1 (Jūryō); 1 (Makushita); 1 (Sandanme)
- Updated on April 2011

Jūmonji Tomokazu (born 9 June 1976) is a former sumo wrestler from Aomori, Japan. Joining the professional ranks in 1992, he reached the top division in 2000 and was ranked there for 34 tournaments until 2007. His highest rank was maegashira 6. He was forced to retire in April 2011 after an investigation by the Japan Sumo Association found him guilty of match-fixing.

== Career ==
Jūmonji was born in Hashikami, Sannohe District, the eldest son of a fisherman. He was named Tomokazu after the actor Tomokazu Miura. He played baseball in elementary school, switching to sumo at the beginning of junior high. Despite the opposition of his parents, he was persuaded by the former sekiwake Aonosato, then the head coach of Tatsutagawa stable, to give professional sumo a try and he made his debut in November 1992. He spent six years in the lower divisions, picking up a tournament championship, or yusho, in the sandanme division in 1995. He reached the second jūryō division in January 1998, fighting under the shikona, or ring name, of Kaigatake, but he lasted only one tournament there. Upon winning promotion back to jūryō in November 1999, he reverted to his own surname, which he used for the rest of his career. He used various names as the second part of his shikona, including Akinori and Masayasu, but returned to his given name of Tomokazu in 2008.

Jūmonji made his debut in the top makuuchi division in May 2000. In September of that year, Tatsutagawa stable was absorbed into Michinoku stable because of the impending retirement of his stablemaster. He made his first winning score in the division in March 2001, but after suffering from a hernia he was demoted back to jūryō and had to miss the September 2001 tournament. Upon his return to competition, he earned immediate promotion back to makuuchi but he mostly remained in the middle and lower maegashira ranks, without making much of a challenge for promotion to the titled sanyaku ranks. Despite competing in 34 top division tournaments and over 500 top division bouts, he never once rose high enough to face a yokozuna or an ozeki. In November 2006, he fell to the jūryō division for the first time since 2002, but he won the jūryō tournament title and was promoted straight back. He was demoted once again in May 2007 after suffering a shoulder injury in the previous tournament. He could only manage a 5-10 score in July 2007, pushing him towards the bottom of the jūryō division.

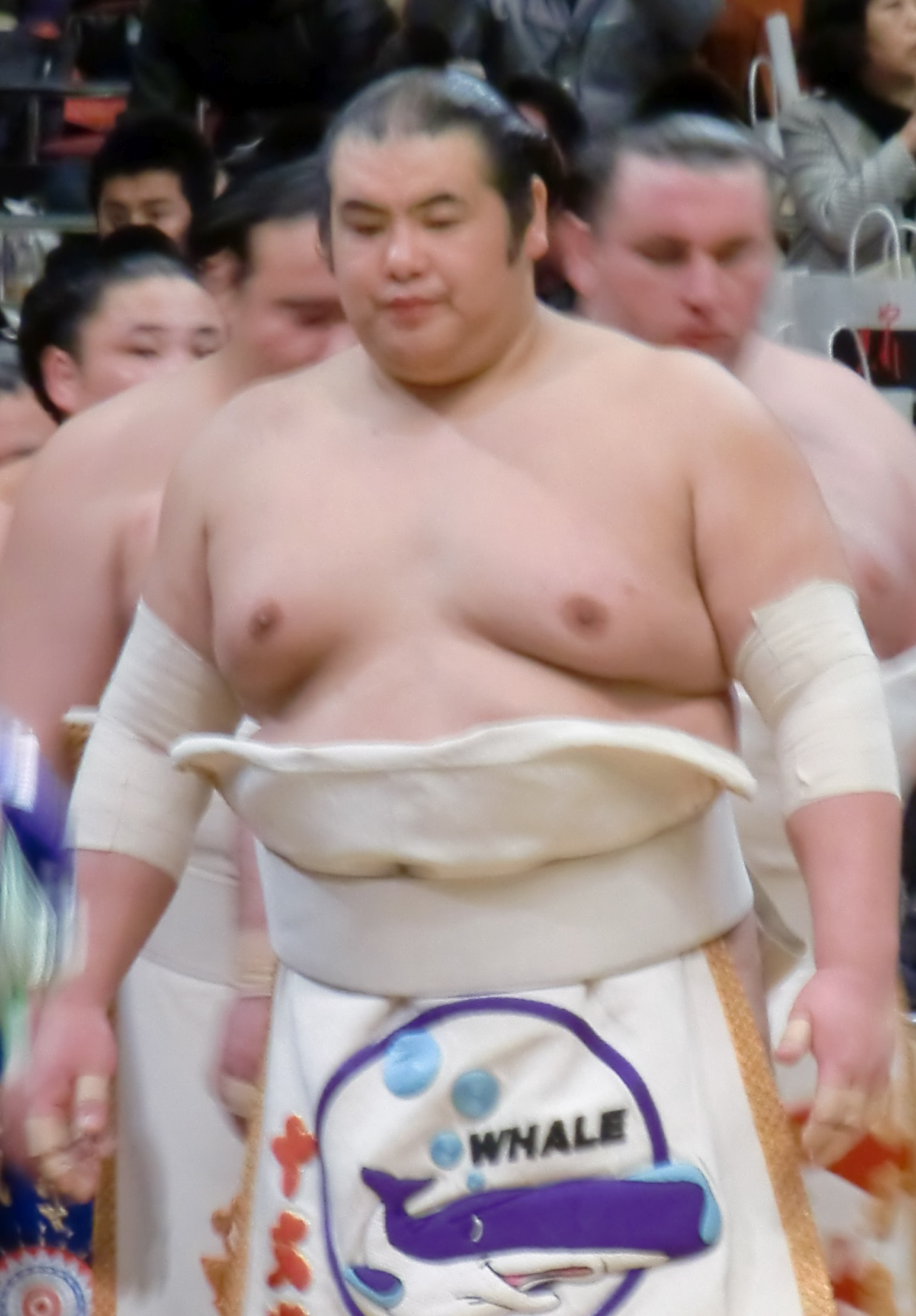
Jūmonji during the dohyo-iri in January 2010.

Jūmonji held onto sekitori status with an 8-7 mark in September 2007, a tournament which saw him record his 500th career win, but could manage only a 3-12 record in November and fell to the unsalaried makushita division for the first time since 1999. He continued to slide down the rankings, turning in losing scores of 3-4 in the tournaments of January and March 2008. After falling to a low of Makushita 20, he recovered with four consecutive winning scores from September 2008 to March 2009. His 4-3 score at Makushita 2 East in March was enough to return him to the jūryō division for the first time since November 2007, where he recorded a winning score of 9-6 in his 100th tournament in sumo. He maintained his sekitori status until January 2010, when he could score only 6-9 at the lowest jūryō rank of No. 14 West. In July 2010, he won the makushita division yusho with a perfect 7-0 record, guaranteeing himself a third return to jūryō. He became the oldest wrestler to win the makushita title at 34 years, one month (a record broken in May 2017 by Ōiwato). He was demoted to makushita once again after the November 2010 tournament.

== Retirement from sumo ==
Jūmonji was one of 23 wrestlers found guilty of fixing the result of bouts after an investigation by the Japan Sumo Association and he was forced to retire in April 2011. He had a topknot cutting ceremony or danpatsu-shiki at the Kokugikan on June 4. He returned to Aomori following his retirement and was reported to be working in newspaper delivery. He suffered from a gastric ulcer in May 2013, resulting in him falling to around 100 kg (220 lb; 16 st) in weight.

== Fighting style ==
Jūmonji was a yotsu-sumo specialist, and in a grappling position preferred a migi-yotsu grip on the mawashi, with his left hand outside and right hand inside his opponent's arms. His most common winning kimarite was a straightforward yori-kiri or force out, which accounted for roughly 40 percent of his victories at sekitori level.

== Career record ==
Jūmonji Tomokazu
Year	January Hatsu basho, Tokyo	March Haru basho, Osaka	May Natsu basho, Tokyo	July Nagoya basho, Nagoya	September Aki basho, Tokyo	November Kyūshū basho, Fukuoka
1992	x	x	x	x	x	(Maezumo)
1993	West Jonokuchi #47; 6–1	West Jonidan #98; 3–4	East Jonidan #118; 5–2	West Jonidan #75; 5–2	East Jonidan #32; 5–2	East Sandanme #95; 5–2
1994	West Sandanme #67; 4–3	West Sandanme #51; 6–1	West Sandanme #5; 2–5	East Sandanme #32; 4–3	East Sandanme #17; 3–4	East Sandanme #32; 3–4
1995	West Sandanme #49; 5–2	East Sandanme #23; 7–0; Champion	East Makushita #17; 4–3	East Makushita #13; 1–6	West Makushita #39; 3–4	East Makushita #48; 4–3
1996	East Makushita #40; 3–4	East Makushita #55; 5–2	West Makushita #36; 3–4	East Makushita #51; 3–4	West Sandanme #4; 5–2	West Makushita #44; 4–3
1997	West Makushita #33; 5–2	East Makushita #21; 3–4	West Makushita #28; 4–3	West Makushita #20; 4–3	West Makushita #14; 6–1	West Makushita #4; 5–2
1998	East Jūryō #13; 5–10	East Makushita #4; 2–5	West Makushita #15; 5–2	West Makushita #7; 4–3	East Makushita #4; 3–4	West Makushita #9; 5–2
1999	West Makushita #2; 3–4	East Makushita #5; 4–3	East Makushita #4; 3–4	East Makushita #8; 5–2	West Makushita #4; 6–1–P	West Jūryō #12; 9–6
2000	West Jūryō #8; 8–7	West Jūryō #5; 10–5	East Maegashira #14; 6–9	West Jūryō #2; 8–7	East Jūryō #2; 9–6	West Maegashira #12; 5–10
2001	East Jūryō #3; 8–7	West Maegashira #13; 9–6	East Maegashira #7; 7–8	East Maegashira #9; 4–11	East Jūryō #2; Sat out due to injury 0–0–15	East Jūryō #2; 8–7
2002	West Maegashira #14; 6–9	West Jūryō #2; 11–4	West Maegashira #9; 6–9	East Maegashira #12; 5–10	West Jūryō #3; 10–5	West Maegashira #13; 8–7
2003	East Maegashira #11; 5–10	West Maegashira #14; 9–6	East Maegashira #9; 8–7	East Maegashira #6; 6–9	West Maegashira #8; 7–8	East Maegashira #10; 8–7
2004	West Maegashira #8; 8–7	West Maegashira #6; 4–11	West Maegashira #12; 8–7	West Maegashira #11; 8–7	East Maegashira #11; 9–6	East Maegashira #7; 5–10
2005	West Maegashira #11; 9–6	East Maegashira #7; 7–8	West Maegashira #7; 6–9	West Maegashira #10; 5–10	East Maegashira #14; 6–9	East Maegashira #17; 9–6
2006	East Maegashira #8; 7–8	East Maegashira #9; 4–11	West Maegashira #16; 8–7	East Maegashira #13; 8–7	West Maegashira #11; 4–11	West Jūryō #2; 13–2; Champion
2007	West Maegashira #10; 4–11	West Maegashira #16; 4–9–2	East Jūryō #6; 6–9	East Jūryō #9; 5–10	West Jūryō #13; 8–7	East Jūryō #12; 3–12
2008	West Makushita #5; 3–4	West Makushita #9; 3–4	East Makushita #16; 4–3	West Makushita #13; 3–4	West Makushita #20; 6–1	East Makushita #4; 4–3
2009	East Makushita #3; 4–3	East Makushita #2; 4–3	West Jūryō #14; 9–6	East Jūryō #10; 8–7	East Jūryō #7; 7–8	East Jūryō #8; 5–10
2010	West Jūryō #14; 6–9	West Makushita #3; 3–4	West Makushita #6; 3–4	East Makushita #12; 7–0; Champion	East Jūryō #7; 4–11	East Jūryō #14; 4–11
2011	West Makushita #6; 1–6	Tournament Cancelled; 0–0–0	West Makushita #25; Retired –	x	x	x
Record given as wins–losses–absences Top division champion Top division runner-up Retired Lower divisions Non-participation Sanshō key: F=Fighting spirit; O=Outstanding performance; T=Technique Also shown: ★=Kinboshi; P=Playoff(s); Divisions: Makuuchi — Jūryō — Makushita — Sandanme — Jonidan — Jonokuchi Makuuchi ranks: Yokozuna — Ōzeki — Sekiwake — Komusubi — Maegashira

== See also ==
- Match-fixing in professional sumo
- List of sumo tournament second division champions
- Glossary of sumo terms
- List of past sumo wrestlers
