= Kirishima Kazuhiro =

Japanese sumo wrestler

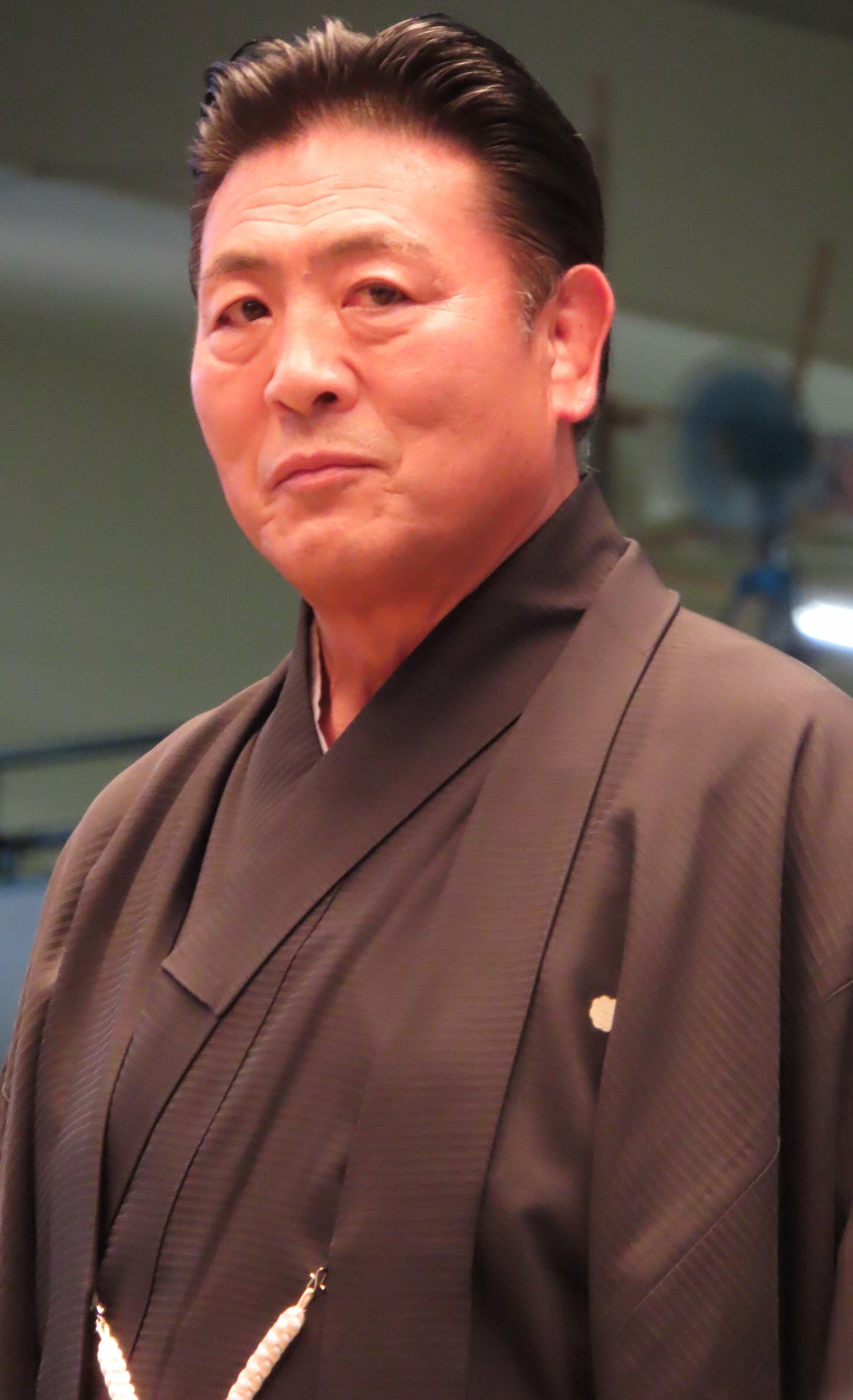
- Michinoku-oyakata during the July 2020 tournament

Personal information
- Native name: 霧島 一博
- Born: Kazumi Yoshinaga; April 3, 1959 (age 67) Makizono, Kagoshima, Japan
- Height: 1.87 m (6 ft 1 1/2 in)
- Weight: 127 kg (280 lb)

Sport
- Sport: Sumo
- Retired: March, 1996
- Heya: Izutsu
- Record: 754–696–40
- Debut: March, 1975
- Highest rank: Ōzeki (May, 1990)
- Elder name: Michinoku
- Championships: 1 (Makuuchi)
- Special Prizes: Outstanding Performance (3); Fighting Spirit (1); Technique (4)
- Gold Stars: 2 (Ōnokuni)
- Updated on July 2007

Kirishima Kazuhiro (霧島 一博; born April 3, 1959) is a former sumo wrestler from Makizono, Kagoshima, Japan, who held the second highest rank of ōzeki from 1990 to 1992 and won one top division tournament championship, and was runner up in seven others. He retired in March 1996, and from December 1997 until April 2024 was the head coach of Michinoku stable under the elder name of Michinoku.

== Early career ==
Kazumi Yoshinaga joined the Izutsu stable in March 1975 to begin his career. He was given the sumo name Kirishima, which came from the national park in his native Kagoshima Prefecture. He reached the jūryō division by May 1982, but only lasted one tournament there. He became established as an elite sekitori wrestler in November 1983 when he produced a 9–6 score at the rank of jūryō 10. He reached the top makuuchi division for the first time in July 1984, and won a sanshō (or special prize for Fighting Spirit) in his very first tournament.

His good looks and slim build made him popular with female sumo fans, and he was sometimes called "the Alain Delon of Japan."

Persistently struggling to gain weight, he enlisted the help of his girlfriend and future wife Naoko in the quest to bulk up and avoid frequent defeats by simple push-out. He was also a fitness fanatic who started out running several kilometres before morning training started at 6am.

One of the lightest wrestlers in the division, Kirishima earned a reputation as a giant-killer, defeating heavyweights such as Ōnokuni and Konishiki several times. However, he seemed to struggle when promoted out of the maegashira ranks. After finishing tournament runner-up and winning the Technique Prize in November 1986 he was promoted to the san'yaku ranks for the first time at sekiwake in the following tournament but could only manage a 3–12 record, and when he finally managed to return to san'yaku at komusubi rank in January 1989 he recorded a dismal 1–14. However, later that year he began a new training regime. In addition to his usual practice matches at Izutsu stable he did regular weight training at a private gymnasium and supplemented his normal sumo diet with a specially prepared high calorie/high protein drink. His efforts paid off. He returned to komusubi in November 1989 scoring 10 wins, and then turned in an 11–4 mark and runner-up performance in January 1990. In March 1990 at sekiwake he produced a superb 13–2 record, defeating yokozunas Chiyonofuji (for the first time in twelve attempts) and Hokutoumi, as well as all three ōzeki. He took part in a rare three-way playoff with Konishiki and Hokutoumi, who had also finished at 13–2. Although Hokutoumi took the title, after the tournament Kirishima was promoted to ōzeki. It was his second straight runner-up performance, earning him his third Outstanding Performance and fourth Technique Prizes, and a three tournament record of 34 wins and 11 losses.

== Ōzeki ==
Kirishima had reached sumo's second highest rank at the age of nearly 31, and the 91 tournaments it took him is the slowest ever promotion to ōzeki. The highlight of his career came in January 1991 when he took his first yūshō or tournament title, by defeating Hokutoumi on the last day. He defeated three yokozuna on three consecutive days in this tournament, a feat not achieved again by a non-yokozuna until Kotoshōgiku did it in January 2016. It was also the first top division championship for Izutsu stable in over sixty years. It had taken him a record 96 career tournaments to win a top division yūshō for the first time, and he was also the oldest first time winner at 31 years and nine months. (Both of these records are now held by Kyokutenhō.) Kirishima finished 1991 with 62 wins, which was more than any other top division wrestler in the calendar year, although it was the lowest number ever needed to achieve that feat. He was only the second non-yokozuna after Wakashimazu in 1984 to do so. He was also runner-up in the tournaments of September 1991, March 1992 and July 1992. However, in September of that year he could only manage a 7–8 score after being restricted by an elbow injury, and he had to pull out of the November tournament on Day 8 with only one win after he ruptured ankle ligaments in a bout against Mitoizumi. As a result, he lost his ōzeki status.

== Later career and retirement ==
Rather than retire, Kirishima chose to carry on fighting in the maegashira ranks. Rather unusually for a former ōzeki, he did not own toshiyori (elder) stock in the Sumo Association and so would have had to borrow a share from an active wrestler or use his own fighting name for a three year grace period if he had retired at that point. The cost of stock had risen sharply and his main sponsor, a real estate company, was going through financial difficulties. In May 1994 he fought fellow ex-ōzeki Konishiki, the first time in 35 years that two former ōzeki had met in the maegashira ranks (Ōuchiyama vs Mitsuneyama in 1959 was the previous occasion). The two rivals became friends off the dohyō, and finished with a head-to-head split evenly at 19 wins each in 38 encounters.

In March 1996 he produced a poor 3–12 record, and facing certain demotion to jūryō, he announced his retirement after 21 years in the sport, just short of his 37th birthday. He was the oldest wrestler in any of the professional sumo divisions at the time of his retirement, and was the last active wrestler born in the 1950s. As well as a loss of physical strength and an accumulation of injuries he had lost about 10 kilos in weight since his ōzeki days. He at first borrowed his stablemate Terao's Shikoroyama elder name, then when that was needed by the retiring Kotogaume he used Tagaryū's Katsunoura name before securing the Michinoku name and becoming the head of the Michinoku stable in December 1997. He has produced several wrestlers with top division experience, including Jūmonji, Toyozakura and Hakuba. In February 2010 he was elected to the Sumo Association's board of Directors, but was forced to step down from his post in April 2011 when four of his wrestlers (Jūmonji, Toyozakura, Hakuba and Kirinowaka) were ordered to retire after being found guilty of match-fixing. The stable absorbed Izutsu stable, Kirishima's old stable in October 2019. As a coach, he also raised ōzeki Kiribayama, to whom he entrusted his own shikona, or ring name, Kirishima, in May 2023.

In May 2023 Michinoku, with the former Kirishima as stablemaster, found itself at the heart of a scandal linked to a case of violence that was made public. A senior wrestler, Kirinofuji, assaulted another young wrestler, Yasunishi, in January 2023 with a frying pan and whipped him with a jump rope. Although Kirishima relayed the case to the Sumo Association in January, he is accused to have covered the violence by directly allowing the aggressor to remain within his stable and allowing him to perform a hair cutting ceremony in April despite the fact that the Compliance Department had not issued an opinion on the case. Despite the filing of a formal complaint by the victim and the press coverage of the case, Hanakago (former sekiwake Daijuyama), the director of the Compliance Department, let the attacker retire without punishment and declared the incident closed because the complaint was withdrawn and the attacker already out of the Sumo Association. Since the Sumo Association was informed in January and the victim withdrew his complaint, Michinoku was initially not subject to any disciplinary action, but after an extraordinary meeting of the board of the Japan Sumo Association on 23 June 2023 it was decided that Kirishima would take a 20% pay cut for 3 months. He also resigned his post as Operations director in the Sumo Association.

Kirishima manages a chanko restaurant, Chanko Kirishima, on Kokugikan Street in Ryōgoku, which is one of the more successful restaurants run by former wrestlers.

In anticipation of his 65th birthday in April 2024, Kirishima announced that his stable would close after the March 2024 tournament, with its wrestlers to be distributed within the Tokitsukaze ichimon. His protégé, Kirishima and he transferred to the care of former yokozuna Kakuryū in Otowayama stable, where he remained as an elder under the system of re-employment (san'yo). At the end of April 2024, he held a stablemaster retirement ceremony where he expressed his satisfaction on having taught over 80 wrestlers.

== Fighting style ==
Kirishima was a yotsu sumo wrestler who preferred grappling techniques to pushing and thrusting. His favoured grip on the opponent's mawashi was hidari-yotsu, a right hand outside, left hand inside position. His most common winning kimarite was yorikiri (force out), and he was also fond of uwatedashinage (pulling overarm throw) and utchari (ring edge throw), the latter of which he memorably used to defeat yokozuna Ōnokuni in September 1988, his first ever kinboshi. His trademark, however, was tsuri-dashi (lift out), a technique requiring tremendous strength and seldom seen today due to the increasing weight of wrestlers and the risk of back injury. Kirishima used tsuri-dashi 29 times in the 15-year period from January 1990, more than any other wrestler. He used it to defeat Chiyonofuji on the sixth day of the March 1990 tournament, leaving Chiyonofuji stuck on 999 wins and delaying the celebrations in the stadium of what would have been the yokozuna's 1000th career victory.

== Career record ==
Kirishima Kazuhiro
Year	January Hatsu basho, Tokyo	March Haru basho, Osaka	May Natsu basho, Tokyo	July Nagoya basho, Nagoya	September Aki basho, Tokyo	November Kyūshū basho, Fukuoka
1975	x	(Maezumo)	East Jonokuchi #13; 2–5	East Jonidan #127; 5–2	East Jonidan #87; 2–5	West Jonidan #106; 4–3
1976	East Jonidan #83; 4–3	East Jonidan #63; 2–5	East Jonidan #81; 3–4	West Jonidan #96; 6–1	East Jonidan #31; 5–2	West Sandanme #81; 3–4
1977	East Jonidan #7; 3–4	West Jonidan #18; 6–1	West Sandanme #53; 4–3	East Sandanme #40; 3–4	West Sandanme #54; 4–3	West Sandanme #39; 3–4
1978	East Sandanme #51; 5–2	East Sandanme #25; 5–2	West Makushita #57; 5–2	West Makushita #40; 3–4	West Makushita #53; 4–3	East Makushita #47; 3–4
1979	West Makushita #58; 5–2	East Makushita #37; 5–2	West Makushita #21; 3–4	West Makushita #31; 5–2	West Makushita #17; 4–3	East Makushita #14; 4–3
1980	East Makushita #10; 3–4	West Makushita #17; 2–5	West Makushita #37; 4–3	West Makushita #28; 4–3	West Makushita #19; 3–4	East Makushita #28; 2–5
1981	East Makushita #47; 6–1	East Makushita #20; 5–2	West Makushita #9; 4–3	West Makushita #6; 3–4	West Makushita #11; 4–3	West Makushita #6; 4–3
1982	West Makushita #2; 4–3	East Makushita #1; 4–3	West Jūryō #13; 6–9	West Makushita #2; 3–4	West Makushita #8; 2–5	East Makushita #22; 5–2
1983	East Makushita #10; 5–2	West Makushita #4; 2–5	East Makushita #22; 5–2	West Makushita #9; 5–2	East Makushita #2; 5–2	West Jūryō #10; 9–6
1984	East Jūryō #5; 10–5	East Jūryō #1; 7–8	East Jūryō #3; 10–5	West Maegashira #12; 8–7; F	West Maegashira #8; 7–8	West Maegashira #9; 8–7
1985	West Maegashira #5; 5–10	West Maegashira #11; 8–7	East Maegashira #7; 8–7	West Maegashira #2; 3–12	East Maegashira #13; 9–6	West Maegashira #4; 6–9
1986	East Maegashira #9; 8–7	West Maegashira #5; 8–7	West Maegashira #2; 4–11	West Maegashira #8; 8–7	West Maegashira #1; 4–11	East Maegashira #7; 12–3; T
1987	West Sekiwake #1; 3–12	West Maegashira #6; 5–10	West Maegashira #12; 8–7	East Maegashira #7; 6–9	East Maegashira #12; 8–7	West Maegashira #7; 7–8
1988	West Maegashira #9; 7–8	East Maegashira #11; 8–7	East Maegashira #7; 7–8	West Maegashira #9; 9–6	West Maegashira #2; 5–10 ★	West Maegashira #6; 10–5; T
1989	East Komusubi #1; 1–14	West Maegashira #9; 10–5	West Maegashira #1; 8–7; O★	East Komusubi #1; 7–8	East Maegashira #1; 8–7	West Komusubi #1; 10–5; T
1990	East Komusubi #1; 11–4; O	East Sekiwake; 13–2–PP; OT	West Ōzeki #1; 9–6	East Ōzeki #2; 6–2–7	East Ōzeki #2; 13–2	East Ōzeki #1; 10–5
1991	East Ōzeki #1; 14–1	East Ōzeki #1; 5–10	West Ōzeki #1; 11–4	West Ōzeki #1; 10–5	West Ōzeki #1; 12–3	East Ōzeki #1; 10–5
1992	West Ōzeki #1; 8–7	West Ōzeki #1; 12–3	West Ōzeki #1; 0–4–11	East Ōzeki #2; 11–4	East Ōzeki #1; 7–8	East Ōzeki #2; 1–7–7
1993	West Sekiwake #2; Sat out due to injury 0–0–15	West Sekiwake #2; 5–10	East Maegashira #2; 8–7	East Maegashira #1; 3–12	East Maegashira #12; 9–6	East Maegashira #4; 3–12
1994	West Maegashira #14; 8–7	East Maegashira #13; 8–7	West Maegashira #11; 8–7	East Maegashira #6; 7–8	West Maegashira #8; 7–8	West Maegashira #10; 8–7
1995	West Maegashira #6; 4–11	East Maegashira #13; 8–7	East Maegashira #8; 6–9	East Maegashira #12; 8–7	West Maegashira #5; 4–11	West Maegashira #14; 8–7
1996	East Maegashira #13; 7–8	West Maegashira #14; Retired; 3–12	x	x	x	x
Record given as wins–losses–absences Top division champion Top division runner-up Retired Lower divisions Non-participation Sanshō key: F=Fighting spirit; O=Outstanding performance; T=Technique Also shown: ★=Kinboshi; P=Playoff(s); Divisions: Makuuchi — Jūryō — Makushita — Sandanme — Jonidan — Jonokuchi Makuuchi ranks: Yokozuna — Ōzeki — Sekiwake — Komusubi — Maegashira

== See also ==
- Glossary of sumo terms
- List of past sumo wrestlers
- List of sumo elders
- List of sumo tournament top division champions
- List of sumo tournament top division runners-up
- List of ōzeki
