= Aonosato Sakari =

Japanese sumo wrestler (1935–2008)

Personal information
- Native name: 青ノ里 盛
- Born: Sakari Ogasawara; November 13, 1935 Kuraishi, Aomori, Japan
- Died: May 16, 2008 (aged 72)
- Height: 1.82 m (5 ft 11 1/2 in)
- Weight: 120 kg (260 lb; 19 st)

Sport
- Sport: Sumo
- Retired: March, 1969
- Heya: Tokitsukaze
- Record: 557-584-10
- Debut: March, 1953
- Highest rank: Sekiwake (May, 1963)
- Elder name: Tatsutagawa
- Championships: 2 (Jūryō)
- Special Prizes: Outstanding Performance (1); Fighting Spirit (1)
- Gold Stars: 5 Kashiwado (2); Wakanohana I Taihō; Tochinoumi
- Updated on June 2020

Aonosato Sakari (born Sakari Ogasawara; November 13, 1935 – May 16, 2008) was a sumo wrestler from Kuraishi, Aomori, Japan. He made his professional debut in March 1953, and reached the top division in January 1959. His highest rank was sekiwake. Upon retirement from active competition, he became an elder in the Japan Sumo Association under the name Hatachiyama. In 1988, he took over as head coach at Tatsutagawa stable from former yokozuna Kagamisato and became Tatsutagawa-oyakata. Two months prior to reaching the Sumo Association's mandatory retirement age of 65 in November 2000, Tatsutagawa stable was shut down and the remaining wrestlers transferred to Michinoku stable.

His son, Moriyuki, was born in 1970 and also became a sumo wrestler, reaching a highest rank of makushita 42 under the ring name of Fusanosato.

== Career record ==
- The Kyushu tournament was first held in 1957, and the Nagoya tournament in 1958.

Aonosato Sakari
Year	January Hatsu basho, Tokyo	March Haru basho, Osaka	May Natsu basho, Tokyo	July Nagoya basho, Nagoya	September Aki basho, Tokyo	November Kyūshū basho, Fukuoka
1953	x	(Maezumo)	East Jonokuchi #4; 4–4	Not held	East Jonidan #41; 6–2	Not held
1954	East Jonidan #13; 5–3	East Sandanme #56; 2–6	West Sandanme #62; 4–4	Not held	West Sandanme #57; 6–2	Not held
1955	East Sandanme #39; 4–4	West Sandanme #31; 5–3	West Sandanme #17; 6–2	Not held	East Makushita #57; 4–4	Not held
1956	West Makushita #54; 1–7	West Makushita #63; 6–2	West Makushita #50; 4–4	Not held	West Makushita #50; 5–3	Not held
1957	West Makushita #38; 6–2	East Makushita #23; 4–4	East Makushita #22; 4–4	Not held	East Makushita #22; 4–4	West Makushita #21; 7–1
1958	West Makushita #10; 5–3	East Makushita #7; 6–2	West Makushita #1; 6–2	West Jūryō #20; 13–2; Champion	East Jūryō #8; 9–6	West Jūryō #5; 14–1; Champion
1959	West Maegashira #17; 8–7	East Maegashira #14; 9–6	West Maegashira #8; 9–6	East Maegashira #4; 5–10	West Maegashira #8; 8–7	West Maegashira #5; 8–7
1960	West Maegashira #3; 5–10	West Maegashira #7; 8–7	East Maegashira #7; 4–11	West Maegashira #12; 7–8	East Maegashira #11; 9–6	West Maegashira #6; 10–5
1961	East Maegashira #1; 6–9	East Maegashira #3; 9–6	West Komusubi #1; 3–12	West Maegashira #6; 9–6	West Maegashira #2; 5–10	East Maegashira #7; 10–5
1962	West Maegashira #1; 8–7; O★★	East Komusubi #2; 5–10	East Maegashira #2; 6–9	West Maegashira #5; 7–8	East Maegashira #6; 6–9	West Maegashira #8; 8–7
1963	East Maegashira #3; 9–6	East Komusubi #1; 8–7	West Sekiwake #2; 3–12	East Maegashira #3; 5–10 ★	East Maegashira #7; 11–4	East Komusubi #1; 6–9
1964	West Maegashira #1; 3–12	East Maegashira #10; 10–5	West Maegashira #3; 5–10	East Maegashira #6; 4–11 ★	West Maegashira #11; 10–5	East Maegashira #3; 9–6; F★
1965	West Komusubi #1; 3–12	East Maegashira #5; 6–9	West Maegashira #6; 8–7	East Maegashira #5; 5–10	West Maegashira #8; 8–7	East Maegashira #5; 6–9
1966	East Maegashira #7; 7–8	West Maegashira #8; 6–9	East Maegashira #10; 8–7	East Maegashira #8; 5–10	East Maegashira #11; 8–7	East Maegashira #6; 5–10
1967	West Maegashira #10; 8–7	West Maegashira #7; 7–8	West Maegashira #8; 8–7	West Maegashira #3; 6–9	East Maegashira #8; 6–9	East Maegashira #10; 9–6
1968	West Maegashira #3; 6–9	East Maegashira #6; 7–8	West Maegashira #6; 6–9	West Maegashira #8; 7–8	East Maegashira #9; 4–11	West Jūryō #1; 8–7
1969	East Maegashira #13; 4–11	West Jūryō #6; Retired; 1–4–10	x	x	x	x
Record given as wins–losses–absences Top division champion Top division runner-up Retired Lower divisions Non-participation Sanshō key: F=Fighting spirit; O=Outstanding performance; T=Technique Also shown: ★=Kinboshi; P=Playoff(s); Divisions: Makuuchi — Jūryō — Makushita — Sandanme — Jonidan — Jonokuchi Makuuchi ranks: Yokozuna — Ōzeki — Sekiwake — Komusubi — Maegashira

== See also ==
- Glossary of sumo terms
- List of past sumo wrestlers
- List of sumo tournament second division champions
- List of sekiwake
