= Michinoku stable =

Defunct sumo stable

Coordinates: 35.6957°N 139.7913°E

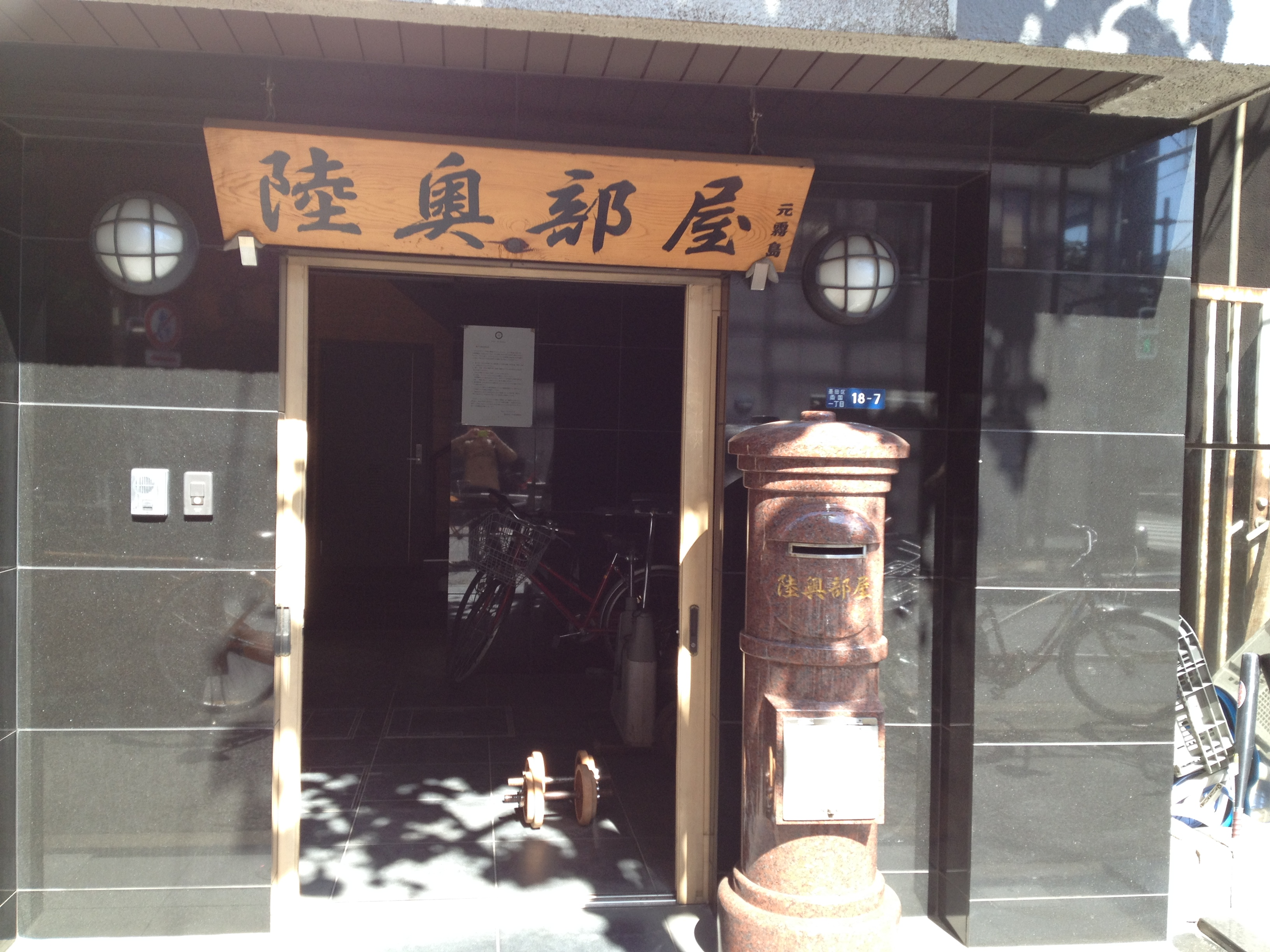

The Michinoku stable (陸奥部屋, Michinoku-beya) (1974–2024) was a sumo stable of the Takasago group.

It was established in 1974 by former maegashira Hoshikabuto, who branched off from Izutsu stable, and closed in April 2024, at the time of the retirement of former ōzeki Kirishima, who became the stable head coach in December 1997.

It absorbed Tatsutagawa stable in November 2000 upon the retirement of the stablemaster there. It lost four top members in April 2011 (Hakuba, Toyozakura, Jūmonji and Kirinowaka), who were forced to retire after being found guilty of match-fixing. The retirement of Ryūhō in 2012 left it with no sekitori until Mongolian Kiribayama reached the jūryō division in 2019. Kiribayama reached the top makuuchi division in January 2020, the first for the stable since Hakuba in 2008. In May 2023 Michinoku's old shikona (ring name) of Kirishima was adopted by Kiribayama following the latter's promotion to ōzeki.

After the death of Izutsu in September 2019, all personnel from Izutsu stable moved to Michinoku on 1 October 2019. This expanded the stable to 15 wrestlers, the most senior of whom was yokozuna Kakuryū, who retired in March 2021. As of January 2023, it had 12 wrestlers.

In May 2023, Michinoku stable was at the heart of a scandal linked to a case of violence that was made public. A senior wrestler, Kirinofuji, assaulted another young wrestler, Yasunishi, in January 2023 with a frying pan and whipped him with a jump rope. Michinoku stablemaster (ōzeki Kirishima) took the abusers side by directly allowing the aggressor to remain within his stable and allowing him to perform a hair cutting ceremony in April despite the information being relayed to the Compliance Department. However, since the Sumo Association was informed in January and the victim withdrew his complaint, Michinoku is not subject to any disciplinary action.

In December 2023 it was announced that Otowayama (the 71st yokozuna Kakuryū), who had remained with Michinoku stable as a coach after his retirement, would break away to establish Otowayama stable.

In anticipation of the stablemaster's (ōzeki Kirishima) 65th birthday, it was announced that the stable would close after the March 2024 tournament, with its wrestlers to be distributed within the Tokitsukaze ichimon. At the March board meeting, it was made clear that the stable would close in April, with half the wrestler retiring. Among the other half, the stable leading wrestler, Kirishima, transferred to Otowayama stable. In the same report, it was also announced that one of the stable's coach, Urakaze, would be transferred with two other wrestlers to Arashio stable. The stable's other coach, Tatsutayama was announced as transferring to Oitekaze stable. Finally, one last wrestler is said to be transferred to Isenoumi stable.

== Ring name conventions ==
In the past wrestlers at this stable took ring names or shikona that began with the character 星 (read: hoshi), meaning star, in deference to two of their former owners. Many also used 霧 (read: kiri), meaning fog or mist, after Kirishima I, such as Kiribayama, Kirinoryū and Kirinofuji.

== Owners ==
- 1997–2024: 9th Michinoku Kazuhiro (yakuin taigū iin taigu iin, ōzeki Kirishima I)
- 1991–1997: 8th Michinoku Yuji (maegashira Hoshiiwato)
- 1974–1991: 7th Michinoku Yoshio (maegashira Hoshikabuto)

== Coaches ==
- Tatsutayama Hironori (iin, maegashira Sasshūnada)
- Urakaze Tomimichi (iin, maegashira Shikishima)

== Notable former members ==
- Kakuryū (71st yokozuna)
- Kirishima (ōzeki)
- Ryūhō (maegashira)
- Hoshitango (jūryō)

== Usher ==
- Shin (makushita yobidashi, real name Shinnosuke Yamaki)

== Hairdresser ==
- Tokotsuru (special class tokoyama)
- Tokodai (first class tokoyama)

== Location and access ==
Tokyo, Sumida Ward, Ryōgoku 1-18-7
1 minute walk from Ryōgoku Station on Sōbu Line

== See also ==
- List of sumo stables
- List of sumo elders
- List of active sumo wrestlers
- List of past sumo wrestlers
- List of years in sumo
- Glossary of sumo terms
