= Toyozakura Toshiaki =

Sumo wrestler from Hiroshima, Japan

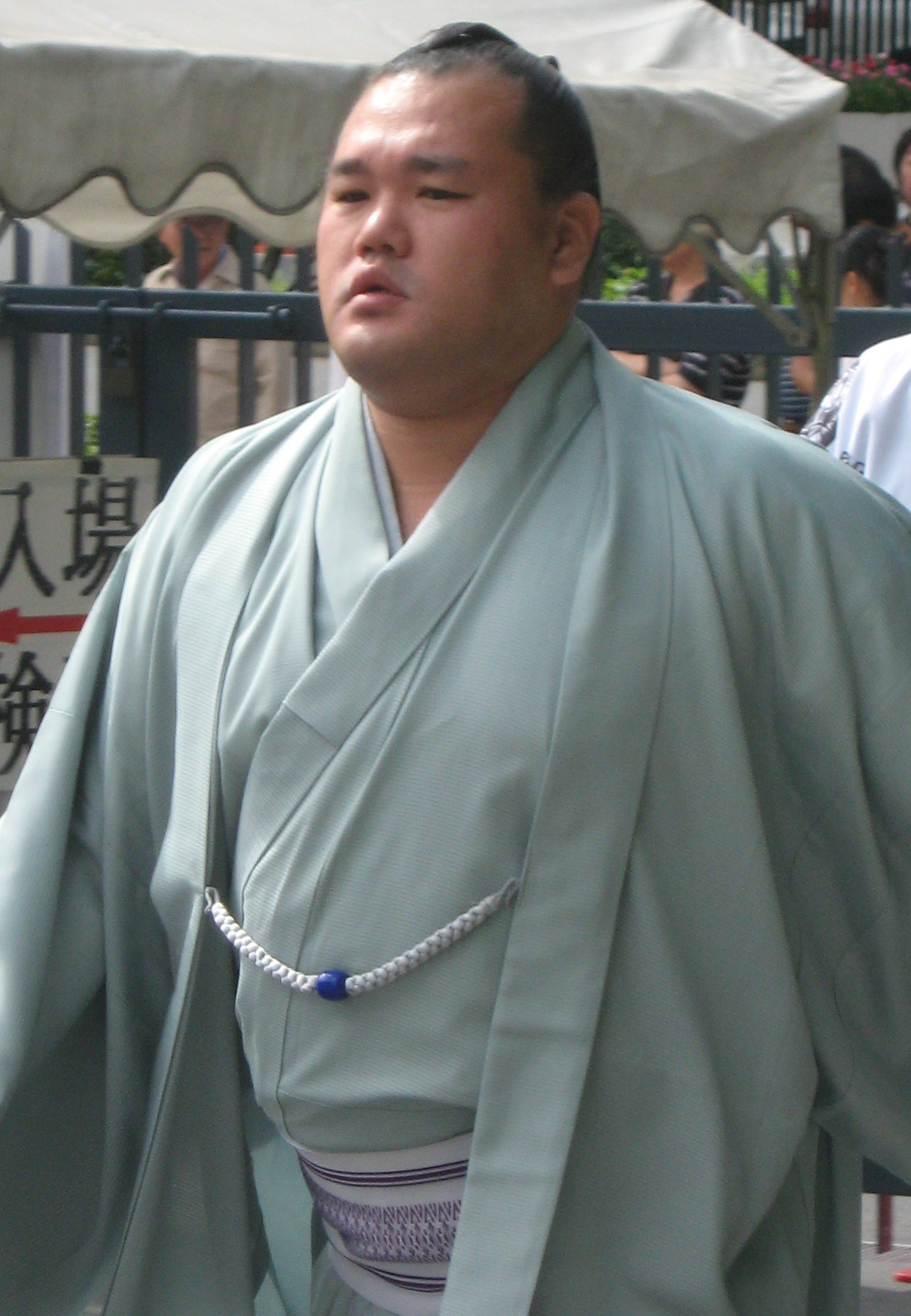

Personal information
- Native name: 豊桜 俊昭
- Born: Toshiaki Mukō; March 12, 1974 (age 52) Hiroshima, Japan
- Height: 1.82 m (5 ft 11 1/2 in)
- Weight: 137 kg (302 lb; 21.6 st)

Sport
- Sport: Sumo
- Retired: April 2011
- Heya: Tatsutagawa → Michinoku, formerly Tatsutagawa
- Record: 683-671-20
- Debut: March, 1989
- Highest rank: Maegashira 5 (September, 2004)
- Championships: 1 (Jūryō); 2 (Makushita); 1 (Sandanme)
- Special Prizes: Fighting Spirit (1)
- Updated on Jan 2011

Toyozakura Toshiaki (born March 12, 1974, as Toshiaki Mukō) is a former sumo wrestler from Hiroshima, Japan. He made his debut in 1989, and after many years in the lower ranks he reached the top division for the first time in 2003. His highest rank was maegashira 5. He was a runner-up in one tournament and earned one special prize for Fighting Spirit. He is the younger brother of Kitazakura. He was forced to retire in April 2011 after an investigation by the Japan Sumo Association found him guilty of match-fixing.

== Career ==
Toyozakura's father was also a sumo wrestler, who fought under the same shikona or sumo name, but he never climbed higher than the fourth sandanme division. He encouraged his son to join a different stable than Kitakazura, so Toyozakura joined Tatsutagawa stable. This stable folded in 2000 upon the stablemaster's retirement and Toyozakura moved to Michinoku stable. He made his professional debut in March 1989. He first reached elite sekitori status in September 1998 upon promotion to the second jūryō division but he could not maintain that rank. It took him another five years to reach the top division, which he finally achieved in November 2003 after re-entering the second division in September 2002. The 88 tournaments it took him to get there is the sixth-slowest ever—even longer than Kitazakura, who took 86 tournaments to reach makuuchi (in 2001).

Though Toyozakura is lesser known than his brother Kitazakura, he spent 17 tournaments in the top makuuchi division, which was five more than his brother, and he also reached a higher rank, maegashira 5. He achieved this after a strong 12–3 record in July 2004, where he finished runner-up to yokozuna Asashōryū, winning the Fighting Spirit prize. He peaked with this performance, however, as he only managed a majority of wins against losses on two further occasions in makuuchi, and spent more time back in jūryō than in the top division.

In May 2006 he won his only second-division championship, having to fight four times in a three-way playoff (tomoesen), winning initially but losing the middle bout before winning twice in a row.

In May 2008 it emerged that the previous January, Toyozakura had beaten a junior wrestler in his stable up to ten times with a ladle, so badly that he required eight stitches. Coming in the wake of the death of trainee Takeshi Saito, he was severely criticised for such actions and issued an apology. Both he and his stablemaster Michinoku-oyakata were docked 30 percent of their salary by the Japan Sumo Association for three months.

His 10-5 performance at the rank of jūryō 4 in January 2009 was enough for a surprise return to the top division for the first time in over two years at maegashira 16. However, he could win only five bouts in the March 2009 tournament. Following the suspension and subsequent demotion of six wrestlers to the jūryō division in September 2010, he returned to makuuchi once again at the age of 36 despite only barely making his majority of wins at the rank of jūryō 11 in the July tournament. His tenth promotion to the top division for the January 2011 tournament put him in fourth place on the all-time list behind Ōshio, Ōnishiki and Ōtsukasa for most promotions to makuuchi.

== Retirement from sumo ==
Toyozakura was one of 23 wrestlers found guilty of fixing the result of bouts after an investigation by the Japan Sumo Association, and he was forced to retire in April 2011.

== Fighting style ==
Toyozakura's favourite techniques were open-handed thrusts known as tsuppari, and simple pushes to the opponent's chest, oshi-dashi. When he chose to fight on the mawashi his preferred grip was migi-yotsu, a left-hand outside, right-hand inside position. He also frequently employed hiki-otoshi, the pull down, and the similar hataki-komi, or slap down.

== Career record ==
Toyozakura Toshiaki
Year	January Hatsu basho, Tokyo	March Haru basho, Osaka	May Natsu basho, Tokyo	July Nagoya basho, Nagoya	September Aki basho, Tokyo	November Kyūshū basho, Fukuoka
1989	x	(Maezumo)	West Jonokuchi #11; 4–3	East Jonidan #129; 3–4	East Jonidan #146; 4–3	West Jonidan #98; 2–5
1990	West Jonidan #138; 5–2	East Jonidan #88; 3–4	East Jonidan #115; 5–2	East Jonidan #63; 3–4	West Jonidan #82; 5–2	West Jonidan #33; 2–5
1991	West Jonidan #65; 6–1	East Sandanme #100; 1–6	West Jonidan #43; 5–2	East Jonidan #2; 2–5	West Jonidan #33; 5–2	East Sandanme #94; 4–3
1992	East Sandanme #77; 4–3	West Sandanme #58; 2–5	West Sandanme #91; 5–2	West Sandanme #53; 3–4	West Sandanme #68; 5–2	West Sandanme #37; 5–2
1993	East Sandanme #11; 4–3	West Makushita #56; 2–5	West Sandanme #15; 7–0; Champion	East Makushita #12; 4–3	East Makushita #7; 2–5	East Makushita #20; 1–6
1994	East Makushita #49; 5–2	West Makushita #29; 4–3	East Makushita #24; 1–6	East Makushita #51; 4–3	East Makushita #41; 5–2	East Makushita #27; 3–4
1995	West Makushita #37; 3–4	East Makushita #48; 5–2	East Makushita #28; 5–2	East Makushita #18; 4–3	East Makushita #12; 4–3	West Makushita #6; 1–7
1996	West Makushita #27; 5–2	East Makushita #17; 4–3	East Makushita #10; 5–2	West Makushita #4; 1–6	West Makushita #25; 3–4	West Makushita #33; 3–4
1997	West Makushita #44; 3–4	East Makushita #55; 5–2	East Makushita #40; 3–4	East Makushita #48; 4–3	West Makushita #39; 7–0; Champion	East Makushita #3; 3–4
1998	East Makushita #7; 3–4	East Makushita #14; 5–2	West Makushita #6; 6–1	West Makushita #1; 6–1	East Jūryō #12; 7–8	West Makushita #1; 2–3–2
1999	West Makushita #11; 3–4	East Makushita #18; 6–1	West Makushita #7; 3–4	West Makushita #12; 4–3	East Makushita #7; 6–1–P	East Makushita #2; 3–4
2000	West Makushita #5; 5–2	West Makushita #1; 5–2	West Jūryō #11; 8–7	West Jūryō #8; 4–11	West Makushita #1; 5–2	West Jūryō #9; 8–7
2001	West Jūryō #7; 5–10	West Jūryō #11; 1–3–11	West Makushita #9; Sat out due to injury 0–0–7	West Makushita #9; 5–2	East Makushita #4; 4–3	West Makushita #2; 3–4
2002	West Makushita #6; 3–4	West Makushita #12; 6–1	East Makushita #2; 7–0; Champion	East Jūryō #8; 5–10	East Jūryō #12; 11–4–P	West Jūryō #6; 7–8
2003	West Jūryō #8; 4–11	East Makushita #2; 5–2	East Jūryō #12; 9–6	West Jūryō #5; 9–6	West Jūryō #2; 10–5	East Maegashira #14; 6–9
2004	East Jūryō #1; 8–7	West Maegashira #15; 6–9	West Jūryō #1; 9–6	East Maegashira #14; 12–3; F	East Maegashira #5; 5–10	East Maegashira #8; 3–12
2005	East Jūryō #2; 9–6	West Maegashira #14; 8–7	West Maegashira #10; 4–11	West Maegashira #16; 9–6	West Maegashira #11; 4–11	West Jūryō #1; 10–5
2006	West Maegashira #12; 7–8	East Maegashira #14; 4–11	West Jūryō #3; 10–5–PPPP; Champion	West Maegashira #14; 5–10	East Jūryō #3; 11–4–P	East Maegashira #8; 5–10
2007	East Maegashira #12; 3–12	East Jūryō #5; 7–8	East Jūryō #7; 7–8	East Jūryō #8; 8–7	East Jūryō #3; 8–7	West Jūryō #1; 5–10
2008	West Jūryō #6; 7–8	West Jūryō #7; 8–7	West Jūryō #3; 8–7	West Jūryō #1; 6–9	West Jūryō #4; 8–7	West Jūryō #1; 6–9
2009	East Jūryō #4; 10–5	East Maegashira #16; 5–10	East Jūryō #5; 5–10	East Jūryō #12; 7–8	East Jūryō #13; 10–5	West Jūryō #3; 5–10
2010	East Jūryō #8; 7–8	East Jūryō #9; 8–7	East Jūryō #7; 6–9	East Jūryō #11; 8–7	East Maegashira #17; 6–9	East Jūryō #2; 9–6
2011	East Maegashira #17; 5–10	Tournament Cancelled; 0–0–0	West Jūryō #3; Retired –	x	x	x
Record given as wins–losses–absences Top division champion Top division runner-up Retired Lower divisions Non-participation Sanshō key: F=Fighting spirit; O=Outstanding performance; T=Technique Also shown: ★=Kinboshi; P=Playoff(s); Divisions: Makuuchi — Jūryō — Makushita — Sandanme — Jonidan — Jonokuchi Makuuchi ranks: Yokozuna — Ōzeki — Sekiwake — Komusubi — Maegashira

== See also ==
- List of sumo tournament second division champions
- Glossary of sumo terms
- List of past sumo wrestlers
