= Kagamisato Kiyoji =

Japanese sumo wrestler

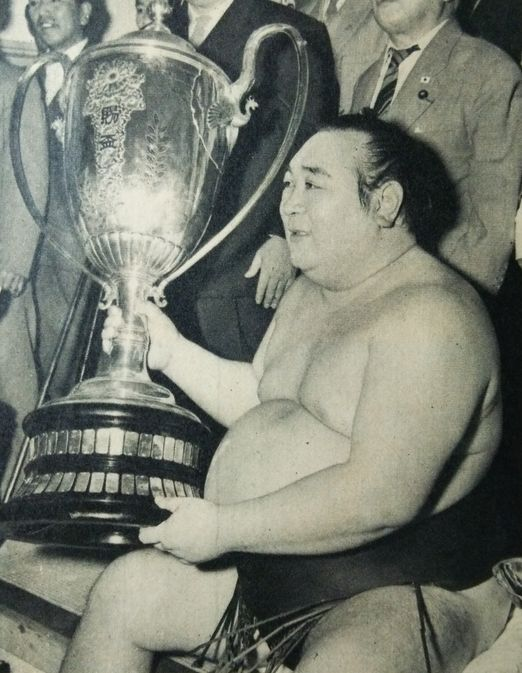
- Kagamisato with the Emperor's Cup after his first tournament victory as a yokozuna in September 1955

Personal information
- Native name: 鏡里 喜代治
- Born: Okuyama Kiyoji; April 30, 1923 Tonai, Aomori, Japan
- Died: February 29, 2004 (aged 80)
- Height: 1.74 m (5 ft 8 1/2 in)
- Weight: 161 kg (355 lb)

Sport
- Sport: Sumo
- Retired: January 1958
- Heya: Tokitsukaze
- Record: 415–189–28
- Debut: January 1941
- Highest rank: Yokozuna (January 1953)
- Elder name: Tatsutagawa
- Championships: 4 (Makuuchi); 1 (Sandanme); 1 (Jonidan)
- Special Prizes: Outstanding Performance (1); Fighting Spirit (1)
- Gold Stars: 2 (Maedayama, Azumafuji)
- Updated on June 2020

Kagamisato Kiyoji (Japanese: 鏡里 喜代治; April 30, 1923 – February 29, 2004) was a Japanese professional sumo wrestler from Aomori Prefecture. He was the sport's 42nd yokozuna.

== Career ==
He was born Okuyama Kiyoji (奥山 喜世治) in a small fishing village in Sannohe District. He came from a poor family as his father had died when he was very young, and he had to support his mother when his older siblings left the house. He was already large as a teenager and soon spotted by a wrestler named Kagamiiwa and invited to join sumo. More interested in basketball, and with his mother also reluctant, the young Okuyama initially refused, but after his family was provided with financial assistance he eventually travelled to Tokyo to repay Kagamiiwa's kindness. In the summer of 1940, he joined the now retired Kagamiiwa's Kumegawa stable. He made his professional debut in January 1941 and was given the shikona or ring name of Kagamisato Kiyoji. When the yokozuna Futabayama established his own stable, Kagamisato followed his stablemaster there, and it was later renamed Tokitsukaze stable.

Kagamisato was promoted to the top makuuchi division in June 1947. In October 1949 he defeated two yokozuna and produced a fine 12–3 score, also becoming the first wrestler to win two special prizes in the same tournament. He was promoted from the maegashira ranks to sekiwake, third from the top. He reached the second highest ōzeki rank just four tournaments after that. Having been a runner-up on four previous occasions, he reached the top yokozuna rank after finally winning his first top division championship in January 1953. There had been four yokozuna competing in that tournament, but all had performed badly, with Terukuni announcing his retirement. Keen to have a strong yokozuna, the Japan Sumo Association overrode the initial objections of the Yokozuna Deliberation Committee and promoted Kagamisato.

During his yokozuna career he won three more tournament titles, all with 14–1 scores, but also had some less impressive results. A somewhat reserved figure, he was perhaps less popular with the public than some of his higher profile yokozuna rivals such as Tochinishiki and Wakanohana I. He also had a difficult relationship with the press.

In the January 1958 tournament, his rival Yoshibayama retired from being an active sumo wrestler. Kagamisato announced that if he failed to win at least ten bouts, he too would retire. He finished 9–6 and kept his word by announcing his retirement on the final day. He had had a chronic knee problem for many years and felt he had reached his physical limit.

== Retirement from sumo ==
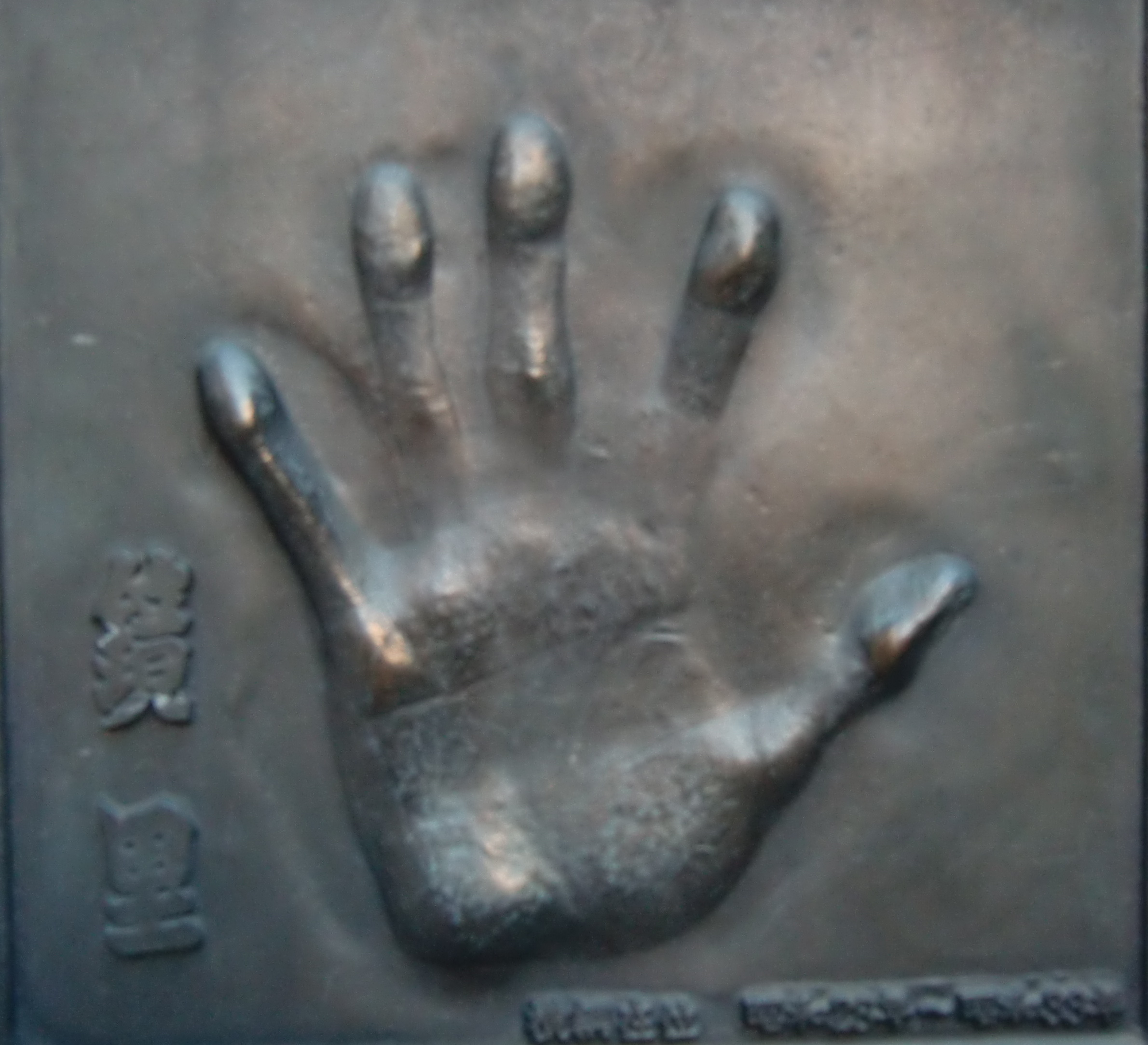
Kagamisato's handprint displayed on a monument in Ryōgoku, Tokyo

After his retirement Kagamisato remained with the Sumo Association as an elder. He briefly became head of Tokitsukaze stable after the death of Futabayama but was forced out as Futabayama's widow wanted Yutakayama to take over. As a result, he switched to the Tatsutagawa elder name and opened up his own Tatsutagawa stable in 1971. He reached the mandatory retirement age in April 1988 and stood down, passing the stable over to former sekiwake Aonosato. He had not managed to produce any top division wrestlers in that time. He remained a heavy man, weighing around 110 kg in his later years, but he still lived until the age of 80, making him the fourth longest lived yokozuna of all time (behind only Umegatani I Wakanohana I, and Tochinoumi).

== Pre-modern top division record ==
- Only two tournaments were held a year through much of the 1940s. The New Year tournament began and the Spring tournament returned to Osaka in 1953.

Kagamisato Kiyoji
| - | Spring Haru basho, Tokyo | Summer Natsu basho, Tokyo | Autumn Aki basho, Tokyo |
|---|---|---|---|
| 1947 | Not held | East Maegashira #14; 7–3 | East Maegashira #8; 5–6 |
| 1948 | Not held | East Maegashira #10; 6–5 | East Maegashira #9; 6–5 |
| 1949 | West Maegashira #7; 8–5 | East Maegashira #4; 8–7 | East Maegashira #1; 12–3; OF★★ |
| 1950 | East Sekiwake #1; 11–4 | East Sekiwake #1; 9–6 | East Sekiwake #1; 8–7 |
| 1951 | West Sekiwake #1; 11–4 | West Ōzeki #2; 10–5 | West Ōzeki #1; 12–3 |
| 1952 | East Ōzeki #1; 11–4 | West Ōzeki #1; 11–4 | East Ōzeki #1; 12–3 |
Record given as wins–losses–absences Top division champion Top division runner-up Retired Lower divisions Non-participation Sanshō key: F=Fighting spirit; O=Outstanding performance; T=Technique Also shown: ★=Kinboshi; P=Playoff(s); Divisions: Makuuchi — Jūryō — Makushita — Sandanme — Jonidan — Jonokuchi Makuuchi ranks: Yokozuna — Ōzeki — Sekiwake — Komusubi — Maegashira

| - | New Year Hatsu basho, Tokyo | Spring Haru basho, Osaka | Summer Natsu basho, Tokyo | Autumn Aki basho, Tokyo |
|---|---|---|---|---|
| 1953 | East Ōzeki #1; 14–1 | West Yokozuna #1; 10–5 | West Yokozuna #1; 12–3 | East Yokozuna #1; 9–6 |
| 1954 | East Yokozuna #2; 13–2 | East Yokozuna #1; 10–5 | East Yokozuna #1; 11–4 | West Yokozuna #1; 9–6 |
| 1955 | East Yokozuna #3; 10–5 | West Yokozuna #2; 4–5–6 | East Yokozuna #2; 11–4 | West Yokozuna #1; 14–1 |
| 1956 | East Yokozuna #1; 14–1–P | East Yokozuna #1; 8–7 | East Yokozuna #2; 9–6 | West Yokozuna #1; 14–1 |
Record given as wins–losses–absences Top division champion Top division runner-up Retired Lower divisions Non-participation Sanshō key: F=Fighting spirit; O=Outstanding performance; T=Technique Also shown: ★=Kinboshi; P=Playoff(s); Divisions: Makuuchi — Jūryō — Makushita — Sandanme — Jonidan — Jonokuchi Makuuchi ranks: Yokozuna — Ōzeki — Sekiwake — Komusubi — Maegashira

== Modern top division record ==
- Since the addition of the Kyushu tournament in 1957 and the Nagoya tournament in 1958, the yearly schedule has remained unchanged.

| Year | January Hatsu basho, Tokyo | March Haru basho, Osaka | May Natsu basho, Tokyo | July Nagoya basho, Nagoya | September Aki basho, Tokyo | November Kyūshū basho, Fukuoka |
|---|---|---|---|---|---|---|
| 1957 | East Yokozuna #1; 3–5–7 | West Yokozuna #2; 11–4 | West Yokozuna #1; 10–5 | Not held | West Yokozuna #1; 8–7 | East Yokozuna #2; Sat out due to injury 0–0–15 |
| 1958 | East Yokozuna #2; Retired; 9–6 | x | x | x | x | x |
Record given as wins–losses–absences Top division champion Top division runner-up Retired Lower divisions Non-participation Sanshō key: F=Fighting spirit; O=Outstanding performance; T=Technique Also shown: ★=Kinboshi; P=Playoff(s); Divisions: Makuuchi — Jūryō — Makushita — Sandanme — Jonidan — Jonokuchi Makuuchi ranks: Yokozuna — Ōzeki — Sekiwake — Komusubi — Maegashira

== See also ==
- Glossary of sumo terms
- List of past sumo wrestlers
- List of sumo tournament top division champions
- List of yokozuna

| Preceded by Chiyonoyama Masanobu | 42nd Yokozuna; 1953–1958 | Succeeded by Yoshibayama Junnosuke |
Yokozuna is not a successive rank, and more than one wrestler can hold the title at once
