= Iranian Jews =

Jewish community of Iran

یهودیان ایرانی יהודי איראן
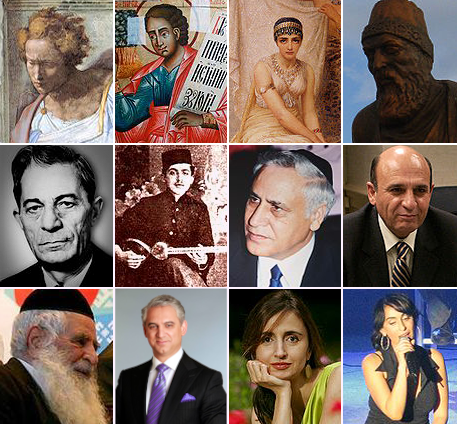
- Notable Iranian Jews

Total population
- 300,000–350,000 (est.)

Regions with significant populations
- Israel: 200,000–250,000
- United States: 60,000–80,000
- Iran: 9,100
- Canada: 1,500
- Australia: ~740

Languages
- Judeo-Iranian languages, Iranian languages, Persian, Hebrew; English (in diasporas), Northeastern Neo-Aramaic (mainly Judeo-Aramaic languages)

Religion
- Judaism

Related ethnic groups
- Mountain Jews, Bukharian Jews, Iraqi Jews, Kurdish Jews, Assyrian Jews, Afghan Jews, Georgian Jews, Mizrahi Jews, Armenian Jews

Iranian Jews, (Note: Persian: یهودیان ایرانی, romanized: Yahudiyān-e Irāni; Hebrew: יהודי איראן, romanized: Yehudei Iran) also known as Persian Jews, (Note: Persian: یهودیان پارسی, romanized: Yahudiyān-e Pārsi; Hebrew: יהודים פרסים, romanized: Yehudim Parsim) constitute one of the oldest communities of the Jewish diaspora. Dating back to the biblical era, they originate from the Jews who arrived in Iran as Babylonian captives. Books of the Hebrew Bible (i.e., Esther, Isaiah, Daniel, Ezra, and Nehemiah) bring together an extensive narrative shedding light on contemporary Jewish life experiences in ancient Iran; there has been a continuous Jewish presence in Iran since at least the time of Cyrus the Great (the 6th century BCE), who led the Achaemenid army's conquest of the Neo-Babylonian Empire and subsequently freed the Judahites from the Babylonian captivity.

After 1979, Jewish emigration from Iran increased dramatically in light of the country's Islamic Revolution and fall of Mohammad Reza Pahlavi, the last Shah of Iran. Today, the vast majority of Iranian Jews reside in Israel and the United States.

== Terminology ==
Today, the terms Iranian Jews or Persian Jews are mostly used to refer to Jews from Iran, which was known historically as Persia. In various scholarly and historical texts, the term has extended to be used in reference to Jews who speak various Iranian languages. Iranian immigrants in Israel, nearly all of whom are Jewish, are referred to as Parsim 'Persians'. In Iran, Persian Jews and Jewish people in general are both described with four common terms: Kalimi (Persian: کلیمی), which is known the most proper term; Yahudi (یهودی), which is less formal but correct; Yisrāel (ישראל), the term Jewish people use to refer to themselves as descendents of the Israelites; and Johūd (جهود), a term with highly negative connotations considered offensive by many Jews.

== History ==
Jews had been residing in Persia since around 727 BC, having arrived in the region as slaves after being captured by the Assyrian and Babylonian kings. According to one Jewish legend, the first Jew to enter Persia was Serah bat Asher, granddaughter of the Patriarch Jacob. The biblical books of Isaiah, Daniel, Ezra, Nehemiah, Chronicles, and Esther contain references to the life and experiences of Jews in Persia and accounts of their relations with the Persian kings. In the book of Ezra, the Persian kings are credited with permitting and enabling the Jews to return to Jerusalem and rebuild their Temple; its reconstruction was effected "according to the decree of Cyrus, and Darius, and Artaxerxes king of Persia" (Ezra 6:14). This great event in Jewish history took place in the late sixth-century BC, by which time there was a well-established and influential Jewish community in Persia.

Jews in ancient Persia mostly lived in their own communities. Iranian Jews lived in the ancient (and until the mid-20th century still extant) communities not only of Iran, but also the Armenian, Georgian, Iraqi, Bukharan, Afghan and Mountain Jewish communities.

Some of the communities have been isolated from other Jewish communities to the extent that their classification as "Persian Jews" is a matter of linguistic or geographical convenience rather than actual historical relationship with one another. Scholars believe that during the peak of the Persian Empire, Jews may have comprised as much as 20% of the population.

According to Encyclopædia Britannica: "The Jews trace their heritage in Iran to the Babylonian Exile of the 6th century BC[E] and, like the Armenians, have retained their ethnic, linguistic, and religious identity." But the Library of Congress's country study on Iran states that "Over the centuries the Jews of Iran became physically, culturally, and linguistically indistinguishable from the non-Jewish population. The overwhelming majority of Jews speak Persian as their mother language, and a tiny minority, Kurdish."

=== Achaemenid period (550–330 BC) ===
==== Under Cyrus the Great ====
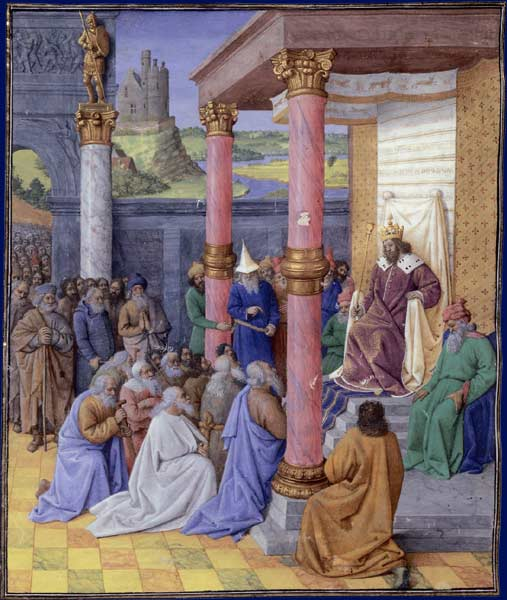
Cyrus the Great allowing Hebrew pilgrims to return to the Land of Israel and rebuild Jerusalem, painting by Jean Fouquet circa 1470

According to the biblical account Cyrus the Great was "God's anointed", having freed the Jews from Babylonian rule. After the conquest of Babylonia by the Persian Achaemenid Empire, Cyrus granted all the Jews citizenship. Though he allowed the Jews to return to the Land of Israel (around 537 BC), many chose to remain in Persia. Thus, the events of the Book of Esther are set entirely in Iran. Various biblical accounts say that over forty thousand Jews did return (See Jehoiakim, Ezra, Nehemiah, and Jews).

The historical nature of the "Cyrus decree" has been challenged. Professor Lester L Grabbe argues that there was no decree, but that there was a policy that allowed exiles to return to their homelands and rebuild their temples. He also argues that the archaeology suggests that the return was a "trickle", taking place over perhaps decades, resulting in a maximum population of perhaps 30,000. Philip R. Davies called the authenticity of the decree "dubious", citing Grabbe. Arguing against the authenticity of Ezra 1.1–4 is J. Briend, in a paper given at the Institut Catholique de Paris on 15 December 1993, who denies that it resembles the form of an official document but reflects rather the biblical prophetic idiom."

Mary Joan Winn Leith believes that the decree in Ezra might be authentic and, along with the Cyrus Cylinder, that Cyrus, like earlier rulers, was through these decrees trying to gain support from those who might be strategically important, particularly those close to Egypt which Cyrus wished to conquer. She also wrote that "appeals to Marduk in the cylinder and to Yahweh in the biblical decree demonstrate the Persian tendency to co-opt local religious and political traditions in the interest of imperial control."

By some accounts, the tomb of the prophet Daniel is located in Susa. The Second Temple was eventually (re)built in Jerusalem, with assistance from the Persians, and the Israelites assumed an important position in the Silk Road trade with China.

==== Under Darius the Great ====
Cyrus ordered rebuilding the Second Temple in the same place as the first; however, he died before it was completed. Darius the Great came to power in the Persian Empire and ordered the completion of the temple. According to the Bible, the prophets Haggai and Zechariah urged this work. The temple was ready for consecration in the spring of 515 BC, more than twenty years after the Jews' return to Jerusalem.

==== Under Ahasuerus (Bible) ====
According to the Book of Esther in the Hebrew Bible, Haman was an Agagite noble and vizier of the empire under Ahasuerus (Biblical Hebrew: אֲחַשְׁוֵרוֹשׁ, romanized: ʾĂḥašˌwēˈrōš), who is generally identified as Xerxes I, the son of Darius the Great, emperor of the Achaemenid Empire, in the 6th century BCE. According to the story, Haman and his wife Zeresh instigated a plot to kill all the Jews in Persia. The plot was foiled by Esther, a Jewish queen consort of Persia. As a result, Ahasuerus ordered the hanging of Haman and his ten sons. The events of the Book of Esther are celebrated as the holiday of Purim.

=== Parthian period (247 BC – 224 AD) ===
Jewish sources contain relatively few direct references to the Parthian influence; the name “Parthia" itself rarely appears in the rabbinic texts. Nevertheless, Jews lived under Arsacid (Parthian) rule for nearly five centuries, mainly in Babylonia (lower Mesopotamia) and adjacent regions. Prince Sanatruk of the Arsacid dynasty of Armenia, is mentioned in the "Small Chronicle" as one of the Diadochoi, or Successors to Alexander the Great. A Roman rescript in favour of the Jews reached an Arsaces as well, according to I Maccabees 15:22 (during the rule of Simon Thassi); however, it is not specified which Arsaces. Not long afterward, Jewish forces under John Hyrcanus I joined the Selucide kingAntiochus VII Sidetes, emperor of the Seleucid Empire, against the Parthians and invaded this region of Lower Mesopotamia. After the allied armies defeated the Parthians (129 BC) at the Great Zab (Lycus), Hyrcanus ordered a two-day halt on account of Shabbat and Shavuot. In 40 BC, the Parthians captured the Hasmonean Hyrcanus II and according to their custom, cut off his ears in order to render him unfit for rulership. The Jews of Lower Mesopotamia, (Babylonia), considered installing a High Priest for the exiled Hyrcanus, independent of Land of Israel. But ultimately a Babylonian Jew, Ananelus (Hananel) was appointed High Priest in Jerusalem, illustrating the importance of the Jews of Lower Mesopotamia community.

The Parthian Empire rested on a loosely structured system of vassal kings rather than tight central control. This arrangement had clear disadvantages, as illustrated by the rise of a short-lived 'robber state' under the brothers Anilai and Asinai near Nehardea in Babylonia during the rein of Artabanus III (c. 18-33 CE). Josephus recounts how the brothers, after defeating a Parthian satrap, were granted limited authority by the king before internal strife and external pressure brought their enterprise to an end. Despite such local disruptions, Arsacid policy towards Jews was generally tolerant and non-interfering in religious matters, continuing in broad outline the approach of the earlier Achaemenid Empire. The most striking example is the conversion of the royal house of the Parthian vassal kingdom of Adiabene -Queen Helena and her son King Izates- to Judaism in the first century CE. These episodes, together with the absence of systematic religious persecution, demonstrate both the practical tolerance of Parthian kings and the extent to which the Parthians positioned themselves as heirs to Achaemenid traditions of governance over diverse populations. So protective were the Parthians of the minority over whom they ruled that an old Jewish saying tells: "When you see a Parthian charger tied up to a tombstone in the Land of Israel, the hour of the Messiah will be near."

The Jewish community of Lower Mesopotamia wished to support their fellow Judean brethren against the Roman Emperor Vespasian, but organized resistance in the Roman Empire mainly occurred during Trajan Parthian campaign (c. 115-117 CE). Jews in the region joined the unrest against Roman forces and suffered heavy losses when the uprising was suppressed.

Philo of Alexandria, writing in the early first century CE, already described a numerous Jewish population east of the Euphrates, including Babylonia. This community grew further through immigration after the destruction of Jerusalem in 70 CE. With the fall of Jerusalem, Lower Mesopotamia became an important center and refuge for Judaism. The collapse of the Bar Kochba revolt (132-136 CE) also appears to have added to the number of Jewish refugees there.

In the struggles between the Parthians and the Romans, the Jews had reason to side with the Parthians, their protectors. Parthian kings elevated their leaders to a kind of nobility, known as the Exilarch. Previously the authorities had used the Jews mainly as collectors of revenue. The Parthians may have granted this recognition for services rendered, particularly to those claiming descent from the Davidic line. The establishment of the Exilarch provided a central authority over the numerous Jewish subjects, who proceeded to develop their own internal affairs.

=== Sasanian period (226–634) ===
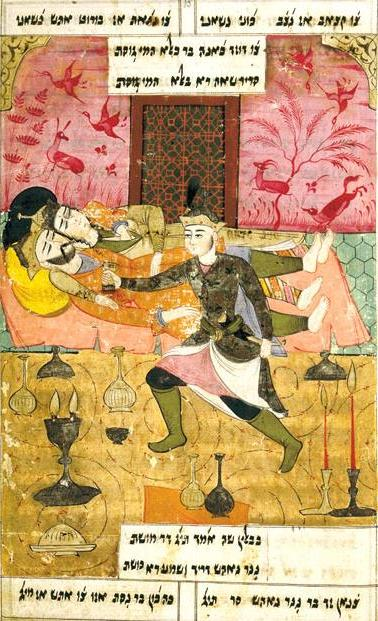
Hebrew version of Nizami Ganjavi's "Khosrow and Shirin"

By the early third century, Persian influences were on the rise again. In the winter of 226, Ardashir I overthrew Artabanus IV, the last Parthian king, destroyed the rule of the Arsacids, and founded the Sasanian Empire. While Hellenistic civilization had been felt amongst the religiously tolerant Parthians, the Sasanians favored Middle Persian and established Zoroastrianism as the state religion.

This move resulted in the suppression of other religions. A priestly Zoroastrian inscription from the time of King Bahram II (276–293) contains a list of religions the Sasanians claimed to have "smashed". "The false doctrines of Ahriman and of the idols suffered great blows and lost credibility. The Jews (Yahud), Buddhists (Shaman), Hindus (Brahman), Nazarenes (Nasara), Church of the East (Kristiyan), Mandaeans (Makdag) and Manichaeans (Zandik) were smashed in the empire, their idols destroyed, and the habitations of the idols annihilated and turned into abodes and seats of the gods".

Shapur I was friendly toward the Jews. His friendship with Samuel of Nehardea gained many advantages for the Jewish community. Shapur II's mother, Ifra Hormizd, was half-Jewish, which gave the Jewish community relative religious freedom and many advantages. The Babylonian Talmud states that he was friends with Rabbah bar Nahmani, who secured a relaxation of the oppressive laws enacted against the Jews. In addition, Raba sometimes referred to his top student Abaye as Shvur Malka, the Jewish Babylonian Aramaic version of "Shapur [the] King", because of Abaye's bright, quick intellect.

=== Arab conquest and early Islamic period (634–1255) ===
With the Islamic conquest of Persia, the government assigned Jews, along with Christians and Zoroastrians, to the status of dhimmis, non-Muslim subjects of the Islamic empire. Dhimmis were allowed to practice their religion, but were required to pay jizya to cover the cost of financial welfare, security and other benefits that Muslims were entitled to (jizya, a poll tax, and initially also kharaj, a land tax) in place of the zakat, which the Muslim population was required to pay. Like other Dhimmis, Jews were exempt from military draft. Viewed as "People of the Book", they had some status as fellow monotheists, though they were treated differently depending on the ruler at the time. On the one hand, Jews were granted significant economic and religious freedom when compared to their co-religionists in European nations during these centuries. Many served as doctors, scholars, and craftsman, and gained positions of influence in society. On the other hand, like other non-Muslims, they were treated as somewhat inferior.

=== Mongol rule (1256–1318) ===
In 1257, Mongols led by Hülegü invaded parts of Persia, and in 1258 they Siege of Baghdad ended the Abbasid Caliphate. In Persia and surrounding areas, the Mongols established a division of the Mongol Empire known as the Ilkhanate, building a capital city in Tabriz. Ilkhanate rulers abolished the inequality of dhimmis, and all religions were deemed equal.

Shortly after this, one of the Ilkhanate rulers, Arghun, favoured Jews for administrative positions and appointed Saʿd al-Dawla, a Jew, as his vizier. The appointment, however, provoked resentment from the ulama, and after Arghun's death in 1291, al-Dawla was murdered, and Tabrizi Jews suffered a period of violent persecution from the Muslim populace instigated by the ulama. The Syriac Orthodox historian Barhebraeus wrote that the violence committed against the Jews during that period "neither tongue can utter, nor the pen write down".

Ghazan's conversion to Islam in 1295 heralded a pronounced turn for the worse for the community in Tabriz, as they were once again relegated to the status of dhimmis. Öljaitü, Ghazan Khan's successor, destroyed many synagogues and decreed that Jews had to wear a distinctive mark on their heads; Christians endured similar persecutions. Under pressure, many Jews converted to Islam. The most famous such convert was Rashid al-Din Hamadani, a physician of Hamadan origin, also a historian and statesman, who converted to Islam to advance his career at Öljeitü's court in Tabriz. However, in 1318, he was executed on charges of poisoning Öljeitü, and his severed head was carried around the streets of Tabriz, chanting, "This is the head of the Jew who abused the name of God; may God's curse be upon him!" About 100 years later, Miranshah destroyed his tomb and his remains were reburied in the Jewish cemetery.

In 1383, Timur began his military conquest of Persia. He captured Herat, Khorasan and all eastern Persia by 1385, massacring large parts of the populations of Nishapur and other cities. He ruthlessly suppressed revolts by massacring the inhabitants of entire cities. During his campaigns, Timur deported large numbers of artists and artisans from Persia to embellish his capital of Samarkand. Specific information on the fate of Iranian Jewish communities under Timurid rule is lacking.

=== Safavid dynasty (1501–1736) ===
==== Conversion of Iran from Sunni Islam to Shia Islam ====
Synagogue in Tehran. A postcard from the Qajar (1794–1925) period.

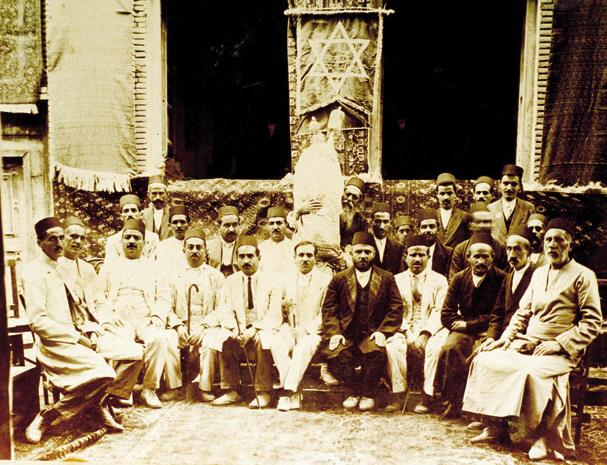
Hamedan Jews in 1918

Safavid Iran (1502–1794) proclaimed Twelver Shi'ism the state religion and invited orthodox ulama from the Levant. This led to a deterioration in the treatment of Iranian Jews. Safavid Shi'ism stressed ritual purity in Islam. Non-Muslims, including Jews, were deemed to be najis, 'ritually unclean', and physical contact would require a Muslim to undertake ritual purification before doing salah, the daily prayers. Thus, the rulers and the general populace sought to limit physical contact between Muslims and Jews. Jews were excluded from hammams used by Muslims. They were forbidden to go outside during rain or snow, as najis could be washed from them onto a Muslim.

The reign of Abbas I (1588–1629) was initially benign; Jews prospered throughout Persia and were encouraged to settle in Isfahan, which was made a new capital. Toward the end of his rule, treatment of Jews became harsher. Shi'i clergy, including a Jewish convert, persuaded the emperor to require Jews to wear a distinctive badge on clothing and headgear. In 1656, Abbas II ordered the expulsion of all Jews from Isfahan because of the common belief of their ritual impurity. They were forced to convert to Islam. The treasury suffered from the loss of jizya collected from the Jews. There were rumours that converts continued to practice Crypto-Judaism. For whatever reason, the government in 1661 allowed Jews to take up their old religion, but still required them to wear a distinctive patch upon their clothing.

=== Afsharid dynasty (1736–1796) ===
Nadir Shah (1736–1747) allowed Jews to settle in the Shi'ite holy city of Mashhad. As many Jews were traders, they were able to prosper due to the connection of Mashhad to other cities along the Silk Road, most notably in Central Asia. In 1839, in an event known as Allahdad incident, many members of the Jewish community were forced to convert to Islam or left Mashhad, to Herat in Afghanistan or cities such as Bukhara in today's Uzbekistan. They became known as "Jadid al-Islams" (new Muslims) and appeared to superficially accept the new religion, but continued to practice many Jewish traditions, i.e. as Crypto-Jews. Except a few individuals, the community permanently left Mashhad in 1946, either to Tehran, but also to Bombay and the British Mandate of Palestine. Most of them still live as a tightly knit community in Israel today.

Bābāʾī ben Nūrīʾel, a ḥāḵām (rabbi) from Isfahan translated the Pentateuch and the Psalms of David from Hebrew into Persian at the behest of Nāder Shah. Three other rabbis helped him in the translation, which was begun in Rabīʿ II 1153/May 1740, and completed in Jomādā I 1154/June 1741. At the same time, eight Muslim mullahs and three European and five Armenian priests translated the Koran and the Gospels. The commission was supervised by Mīrzā Moḥammad Mahdī Khan Monšī, the court historiographer and author of the Tārīḵ-ejahāngošā-ye nāderī. Finished translations were presented to Nāder Shah in Qazvīn in June, 1741, who, however, was not impressed. There had been previous translations of the Jewish holy books into Persian, but Bābāʾī's translation is notable for the accuracy of the Persian equivalents of Hebrew words, which has made it the subject of study by linguists. Bābāʾī's introduction to the translation of the Psalms of David is unique, and sheds a certain amount of light on the teaching methods of Iranian Jewish schools in eighteenth-century Iran. He is not known to have written anything else.

=== Qajar dynasty (1789–1925) ===
The advent of the Qajar dynasty in 1794 brought back the earlier persecutions.

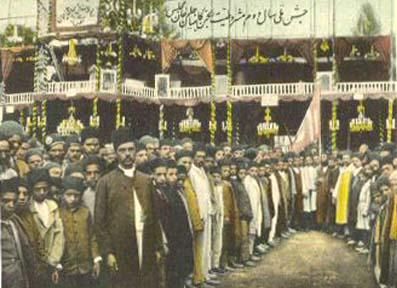
A Jewish gathering celebrates the second anniversary of the Iranian Constitutional Revolution in Tehran.

Lord Curzon described 19th-century regional differences in the situation of the Persian Jews: "In Isfahan, where they are said to be 3,700 and where they occupy a relatively better status than elsewhere in Persia, they are not permitted to wear kolah or Persian headdress, to have shops in the bazaar, to build the walls of their houses as high as a Moslem neighbour's, or to ride in the street. In Teheran and Kashan they are also to be found in large numbers and enjoying a fair position. In Shiraz they are very badly off. In Bushire they are prosperous and free from persecution."

In the 19th century, the colonial powers from Europe began noting numerous forced conversions and massacres, usually generated by Shi'a clergy. Two major blood-libel conspiracies had taken place during this period, one in Shiraz and the other in Tabriz. A document recorded after the incident states that the Jews faced two options, conversion to Islam or death. Amidst the chaos, Jews had converted, but most refused to convert to Islam – described within the document was a boy of age 16 named Yahyia who refused to convert to Islam and was subsequently killed. The same year saw a forcible conversion of the Jews of Shiraz over a similar incident. The Allahdad incident of 1839 was mentioned above. European travellers reported that the Jews of Tabriz and Shiraz continued to practice Judaism in secret despite a fear of further persecutions. Famous Iranian-Jewish teachers such as Mullah Daoud Chadi continued to teach and preach Judaism, inspiring Jews throughout the nation. Jews of Barforush, Mazandaran were forcibly converted in 1866. When the French and British ambassadors intervened to allow them to practice their traditional religion, a mob killed 18 Jews.

In the middle of the 19th century, J. J. Benjamin wrote about the life of Persian Jews, describing conditions and beliefs that went back to the 16th century:

They are obliged to live in a separate part of town…; for they are considered as unclean creatures… Under the pretext of their being unclean, they are treated with the greatest severity and should they enter a street, inhabited by Mussulmans, they are pelted by the boys and mobs with stones and dirt… For the same reason, they are prohibited to go out when it rains; for it is said the rain would wash dirt off them, which would sully the feet of the Mussulmans… If a Jew is recognized as such in the streets, he is subjected to the greatest insults. The passers-by spit in his face, and sometimes beat him… unmercifully… If a Jew enters a shop for anything, he is forbidden to inspect the goods… Should his hand incautiously touch the goods, he must take them at any price the seller chooses to ask for them... Sometimes the Persians intrude into the dwellings of the Jews and take possession of whatever please them. Should the owner make the least opposition in defense of his property, he incurs the danger of atoning for it with his life... If... a Jew shows himself in the street during the three days of the Katel (Muharram)…, he is sure to be murdered.

A group of Persian Jewish refugees escaping persecution back home in Mashhad, Qajar Persia, were granted rights to settle in the Sikh Empire around the year 1839. Most of the Jewish families settled in Rawalpindi (specifically in the Babu Mohallah neighbourhood) and Peshawar.

In 1868, Jews were the most significant minority in Tehran, numbering 1,578 people. By 1884 this figure had risen to 5,571.

In 1892, an Ottoman archival record indicates that a group of 200 Iranian Jews who tried to migrate to the Land of Israel were returned to Iran.

In 1894, a representative of the Alliance Israélite Universelle, a Jewish humanitarian and educational organization, wrote from Tehran: "...every time that a priest wishes to emerge from obscurity and win a reputation for piety, he preaches war against the Jews".

In 1901, the riot of Shaykh Ibrahim was sparked against the Jews of Tehran. An imam began preaching on the importance of eliminating alcohol for the sake of Islamic purity, leading to an assault against Jews for refusing to give up the wine they drank for Sabbath.

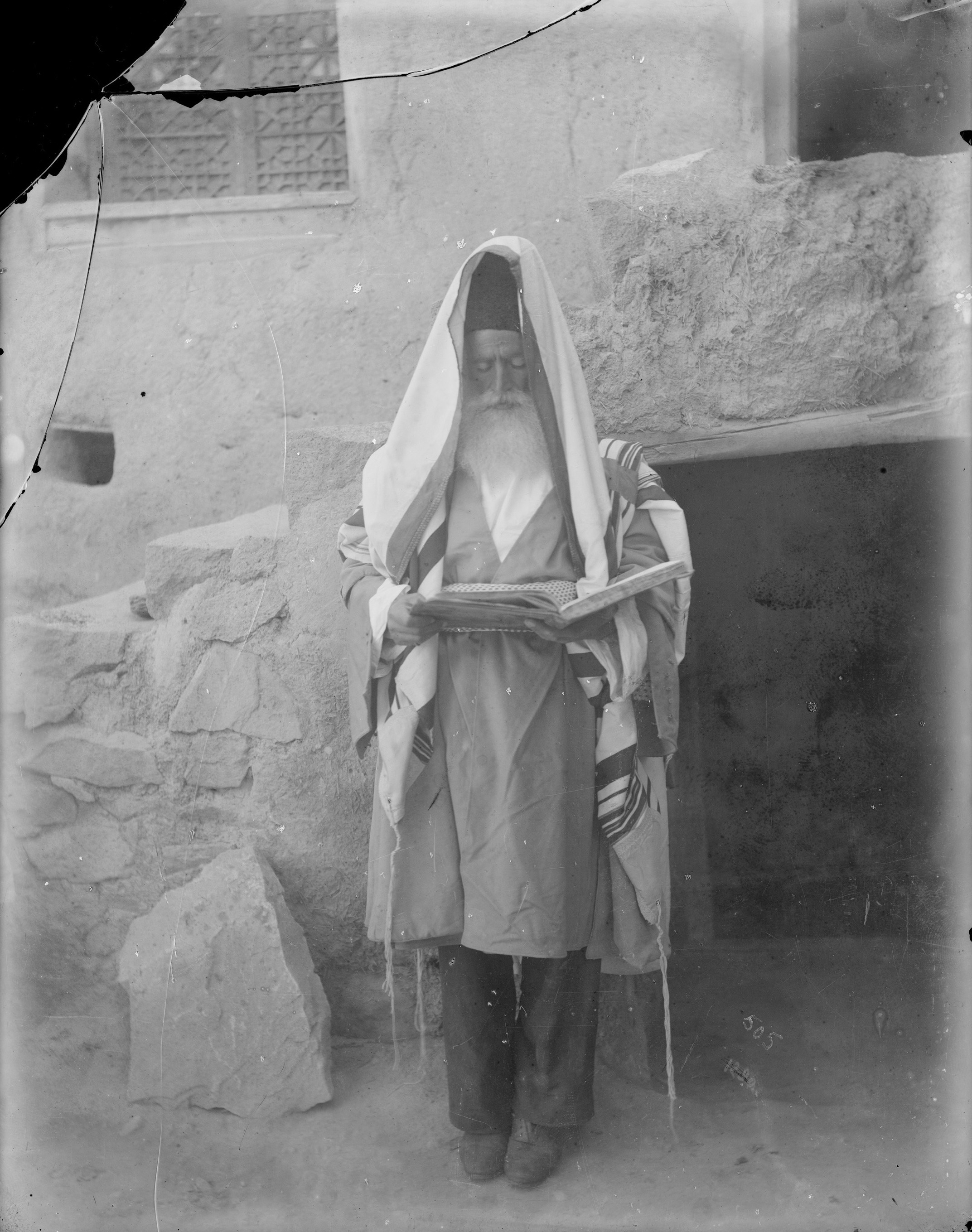
Photograph of Iranian Rabbi by Antoin Sevruguin

In 1910, there were rumors that the Jews of Shiraz had ritually murdered a Muslim girl. Muslims plundered the whole Jewish quarter. The first to start looting were soldiers sent by the local governor to defend the Jews against the enraged mob. Twelve Jews who tried to defend their property were killed, and many others were injured. Representatives of the Alliance Israélite Universelle recorded numerous instances of persecution and debasement of Iranian Jews. In the late 19th to early 20th century, thousands of Iranian Jews immigrated to the territory of present-day Israel within the Ottoman Empire to escape such persecution.

=== Pahlavi dynasty (1925–1979) ===
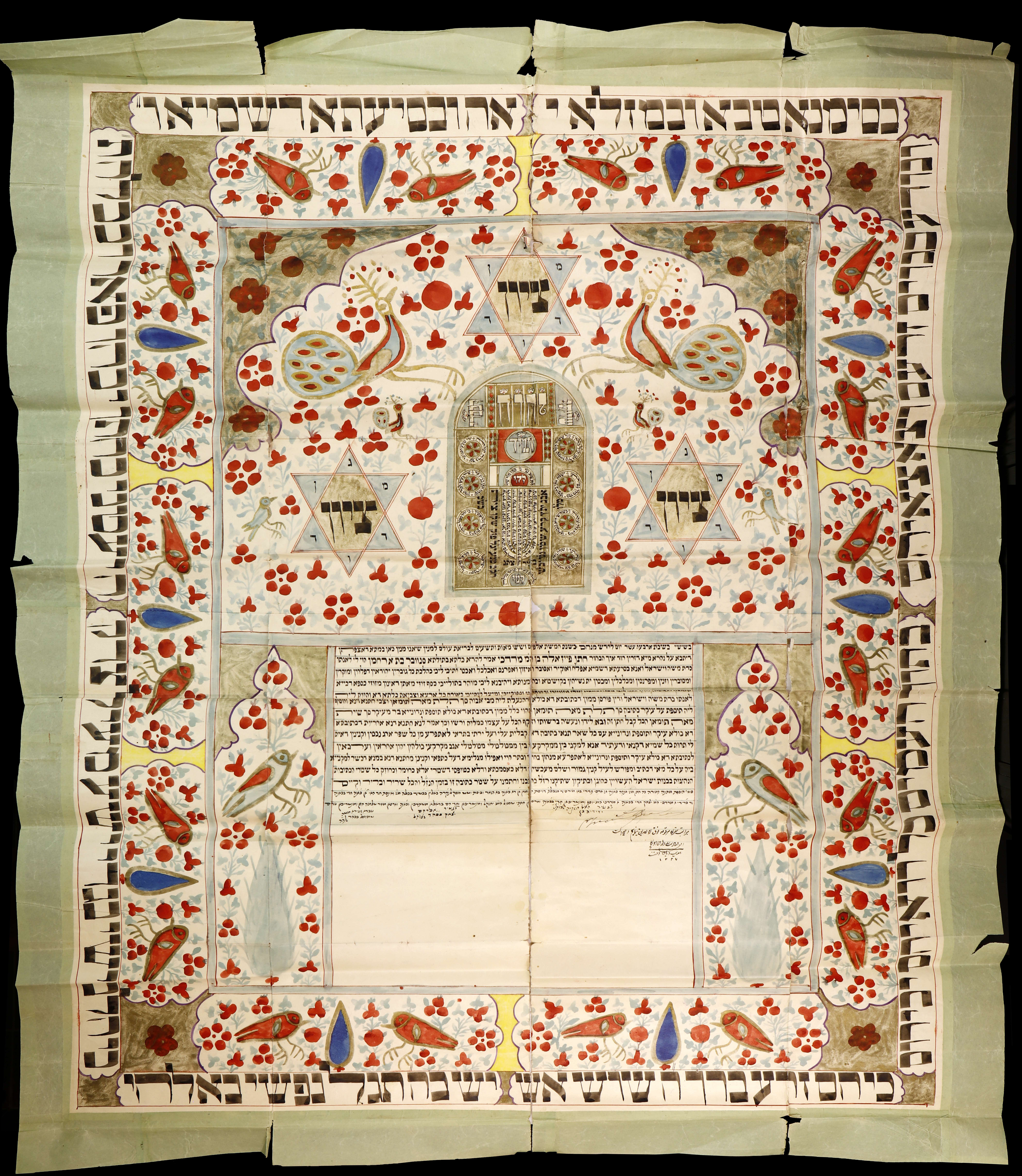
A ketubah Jewish marriage contract Iran 1930, Younes & Soraya Nazarian library, University of Haifa Digital collections

The Pahlavi dynasty implemented modernizing reforms, which greatly improved the life of Jews. The influence of the Shi'a clergy was weakened, and the restrictions on Jews and other religious minorities were abolished. According to Charles Recknagel and Azam Gorgin of Radio Free Europe, during the reign of Reza Shah "the political and social conditions of the Jews changed fundamentally." Reza Shah prohibited mass conversion of Jews and eliminated the concept of uncleanness of non-Muslims. He allowed incorporation of modern Hebrew into the curriculum of Jewish schools and publication of Jewish newspapers. Jews were also allowed to hold government jobs.

By 1932, Tehran's Jewish population had risen to 6,568. During World War II, Iran declared itself neutral, but was invaded by Anglo-Soviet forces in 1941. During the Allied occupation, many Polish and Jewish refugees that escaped Nazi-occupied Poland settled within Iran (see Iran–Poland relations).

At the time of the establishment of the state of Israel in 1948, there were approximately 140,000–150,000 Jews living in Iran, the historical center of Iranian Jewry. Over 95% have since migrated abroad.

The violence and disruption in Arab life associated with the founding of Israel and its victory in the 1948 Arab–Israeli War drove increased anti-Jewish sentiment in Iran. This continued until 1953, in part because of the weakening of the central government and strengthening of clergy in the political struggles between the shah and prime minister Mohammad Mossadegh. From 1948 to 1953, about one-third of Iranian Jews, most of them poor, immigrated to Israel. David Littman puts the total figure of Iranian Jews who immigrated to Israel between 1948 and 1978 at 70,000.

After the deposition of Mossadegh in 1953, the reign of shah Mohammad Reza Pahlavi was the most prosperous era for the Jews of Iran. By the 1970s, only 10% of Iranian Jews were classified as lower class; 80% were middle class and 10% wealthy. Although Jews accounted for only a fraction of a percent of Iran's population, in 1979 2 of the 18 members of the Iranian Academy of Sciences, 80 of the 4,000 university lecturers, and 600 of the 10,000 physicians in Iran were Jews. During this period, Iranian Jewish society underwent rapid social mobility and civic integration, which shaped Iranian Jewish identity in many ways that diverged markedly from previous generations. The younger generation was considerably more attuned to the political critiques of the Shah's government that circulated among non-Jewish Iranians, and more actively involved in underground political movements. This shift drew a significant number of young Iranian Jews into the broader protest movement and into active participation in the revolutionary movement of 1978-79.

Prior to the Islamic Revolution in 1979, there were 100,000 Jews in Iran, mostly concentrated in Tehran (60,000), Shiraz (18,000), Kermanshah (4,000), and Isfahan (3,000). Jews were also located in other various cities throughout Iran, including Urmia (800), Salmas (400), Miandoab (60), Baneh, Mashhad, Kashan, Sanandaj, Saqqez, Tazeh Qaleh, Chichakluy-e Bash Qaleh, Garrus, Qaslan, Hamadan, Tuyserkan, Nahavand, Kermanshah, Hashtrud, Zehab, Babol, Siahkal, Damavand, Bushehr, Kazerun, Torbat-e Heydarieh, Sarakhs, Yazd, Arak, and Khorramabad.

=== Islamic Republic (1979–present) ===
At the time of the 1979 Islamic Revolution, 80,000–100,000 Jews were living in Iran. From then on, Jewish emigration from Iran dramatically increased, as about 20,000 Jews left within several months of the revolution alone. The majority of Iran's Jewish population, some 60,000 Jews, emigrated in the aftermath of the revolution, of whom 35,000 went to the United States, 20,000 to Israel, and 5,000 to Europe (mainly to the United Kingdom, France, Denmark, Germany, Italy, and Switzerland). Some sources put the Iranian Jewish population in the mid and late 1980s as between 50,000 and 60,000. An estimate based on the 1986 census put the figure considerably higher for the same time, around 55,000. From the mid-1990s to the present there has been more uniformity in the figures, with most government sources since then estimating roughly 25,000 Jews remaining in Iran. These less recent official figures are considered bloated, and the Jewish community may not amount to more than 10,000. A 2012 census put the figure at about 8,756.

Ayatollah Khomeini met with the Jewish community upon his return from exile in Paris, when heads of the community, disturbed by the execution of one of their most distinguished representatives, the industrialist Habib Elghanian, arranged to meet him in Qom. At one point he said:

In the holy Quran, Moses, salutations upon him and all his kin, has been mentioned more than any other prophet. Prophet Moses was a mere shepherd when he stood up to the might of pharaoh and destroyed him. Moses, the Speaker-to-Allah, represented pharaoh's slaves, the downtrodden, the mostazafeen of his time.

At the end of the discussion Khomeini declared, "We recognize our Jews as separate from those godless, bloodsucking Zionists", and issued a fatwa decreeing that the Jews were to be protected.

Habib Elghanian was arrested and sentenced to death by an Islamic revolutionary tribunal shortly after the Islamic revolution for charges including corruption, contacts with Israel and Zionism, and "friendship with the enemies of God", and was executed by a firing squad. He was the first Jew and businessman to be executed by the Islamic government. His execution caused fear among the Jewish community and caused many to flee Iran. Soli Shahvar, professor of Iranian Studies at the University of Haifa describes the process of dispossession : "There were two waves of confiscation of homes, farmlands and factories of Jews in Iran. In the first wave, the authorities seized the properties of a small group of Jews who were accused of helping Zionism financially. In the second wave, authorities confiscated the properties of Jews who left the country after the Revolution. They left everything in fear for their lives and the Islamic Republic confiscated their properties using their absence as an excuse".

During the Iran–Iraq War, which lasted from 1980 to 1988, Iranian Jews were conscripted into the Islamic Republic of Iran Armed Forces, and 13 were killed in the war.

In the Islamic republic, Jews have become more religious. Families who had been secular in the 1970s started adhering to kosher dietary laws and more strictly observed rules against driving on the Shabbat. They stopped going to restaurants, cafes and cinemas and the synagogue became the focal point of their social lives.

Haroun Yashyaei, a film producer and former chairman of the Central Jewish Community in Iran said, "Khomeini didn't mix up our community with Israel and Zionism – he saw us as Iranians."

In June 2007, though there were reports that wealthy expatriate Jews established a fund to offer incentives to Iranian Jews to immigrate to Israel, few took them up on the offer. The Society of Iranian Jews dismissed this act as "immature political enticements" and said that their national identity was not for sale.

Jews in the Islamic Republic of Iran are formally to be treated equally and free to practice their religion. There is even a seat in the Iranian parliament reserved for the representative of the Iranian Jews. However, de facto discrimination is common.

On the evening of 6 April 2026, the Rafi'-Nia synagogue in central Tehran was completely destroyed by Israeli warplanes during the 2026 Iran war; nobody was injured. The Israel Defense Forces described the destruction as "collateral damage" from a strike targeting an Iranian military commander. The Jewish community condemned the attack.

== Current status ==
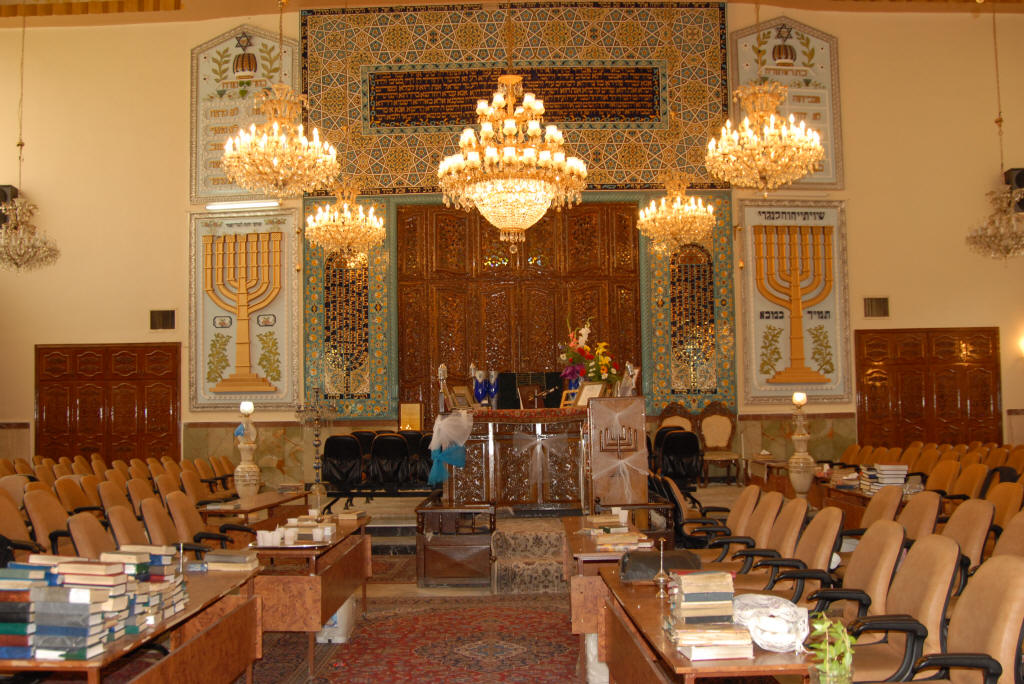
Yusef Abad synagogue in Tehran

Iran's Jewish community is officially recognized as a religious minority group by the government, and, like the Zoroastrians and Christians, they are allocated one seat in the Iranian Parliament. Homayoun Sameh is the current Jewish member of the parliament, replacing Siamak Moreh Sedgh in the 2020 election. In 2000, former Jewish MP Manuchehr Eliasi estimated that at that time there were still 60,000–85,000 Jews in Iran; most other sources put the figure at 25,000. In 2011 the Jewish population numbered 8,756. In 2016 Jewish population numbered 9,826. In 2019 the Jewish Population numbered 8,300 and they constitute 0.01% of Iranian population, a number claimed in 2017 by Sergio DellaPergola, a leading Jewish demographer.

Iranian Jews have their own newspaper (called "Ofogh-e-Bina") with Jewish scholars performing Judaic research at Tehran's "Central Library of Jewish Association". The Dr. Sapir Jewish Hospital is Iran's largest charity hospital of any religious minority community in the country; however, most of its patients and staff are Muslim.

Chief Rabbi Yousef Hamadani Cohen was the spiritual leader for the Jewish community of Iran from 1994 to 2007, when he was succeeded by Mashallah Golestani-Nejad. In August 2000, Cohen met with Iranian President Mohammad Khatami for the first time. In 2003, Cohen and Motamed met with Khatami at Yusef Abad Synagogue, which was the first time a President of Iran had visited a synagogue since the Islamic Revolution. Haroun Yashayaei is the chairman of the Jewish Committee of Tehran and leader of Iran's Jewish community. On 26 January 2007, Yashayaei's letter to President Mahmoud Ahmadinejad concerning his Holocaust denial comments brought about worldwide media attention.

Historically, Iranian Jews were particularly associated with certain crafts and trades, including gold and silver jewelry making, as well as commerce in antiques, textiles, and carpets.

=== Societal environment ===
Iranian Jewish men are conscripted into the Iranian Armed Forces like all Iranian men. Many Iranian Jews fought during the Iran–Iraq War (1980–1988) as drafted soldiers, and about 15 were killed.

Israel Hayom reported that Iranian Jews in Israel say that they viewed Iran as their home and were allowed to practice Judaism freely, but that there was suspicion and fear, too.

Following the assassination of Qassem Soleimani, the head rabbi of Iran, Yehuda Gerami, visited the family of Soleimani and issued anti-Israel statements. He later discussed the matter with an American audience, saying that Israel's attacks on Soleimani had stoked tensions in the Jewish community in Iran, and he felt the need to take public action to deescalate the situation. He is reported to have said that the Iranian Jewish community prefers to avoid such political entanglements. On 31 July 2024, the Tehran Central Jewish committee issued a statement condemning the assassination of Hamas leader Ismail Haniyeh and called for an Iranian response.

It has been asserted that the majority of Iranian Jews prefer to stay in Iran because they are allowed to live a comfortable Jewish life there, but Sam Kermanian, who served as Secretary-General of the Iranian American Jewish Federation for fifteen years, disputed this claim, stating that the majority of Iranian Jews are elderly and only speak Persian, and as a result they are less naturally inclined to emigrate. According to Ran Amrani, an Iranian-born Israeli director of a Persian language radio station with close ties inside Iran, wealthy Iranian Jews won't leave because the international sanctions on Iran have so downgraded Iran's currency in value that they would see a massive drop in their standard of living in Israel, with those who own multiple homes in Iran unable to afford a single apartment in Israel, while poor Iranian Jews would find it difficult to restart their lives in Israel in middle age. Amrani claimed that while Jews are allowed to practice their religion, they live in fear of being accused of spying for Israel and that they publicly distance themselves from Israel and Zionism to ensure their own security.

Opinion over the condition of Jews in Iran is divided. One Jewish voice presenting a benevolent view of the Iranian Islamic government and society toward Jews is film producer Haroun Yashayaei, who says "[Ayatollah Ruhollah] Khomeini didn't mix up our community with Israel and Zionism—he saw us as Iranians." Privately, many Jews complain of "discrimination, much of it of a social or bureaucratic nature." The Islamic government appoints the officials who run Jewish schools, most of these being Muslims, and until 2015, required that those schools must open on Saturdays, the Jewish Sabbath. Criticism of this policy was the downfall of the last remaining newspaper of the Iranian Jewish community which was closed in 1991 after it criticized government control of Jewish schools. Instead of expelling Jews en masse like in Libya, Iraq, Egypt, and Yemen, the Iranians have adopted a policy of keeping Jews in Iran.

The desire for survival may prompt Iranian Jews to overstate their anti-Israel positions. Their response to the questions regarding Israel have been outright denial of Israel or staying quiet. An example of the dilemma of Iranian Jews can be observed in this example: "We hear the ayatollah say that Israel was cooperating with the Shah and SAVAK, and we would be fools to say we support Israel. So we just keep quiet about it... Maybe it will work out. Anyway, what can we do? This is our home."

Thirteen Jews have been executed in Iran since the Islamic revolution, most of them, at least in part for their alleged connections to Israel. Among them was Habib Elghanian, one of the most prominent Jews of Iran in the 1970s. As head of the Iranian Jewish community, he was executed by firing squad by the Islamic government shortly after the Islamic Revolution of 1979 on the charge of having been in contact with Israel, among others. In May 1998, Jewish businessman Ruhollah Kadkhodah-Zadeh was hanged in prison without a public charge or legal proceeding, apparently for assisting Jews to emigrate. In 2024, the pending execution of Persian Jew Arvin Ghahremani was delayed by a month after a global campaign calling for his commutation and criticism that Ghahremani was being subjected to a discriminatory judicial system that prioritized Muslims over Jews.

=== Contact with non-Persian Jews ===
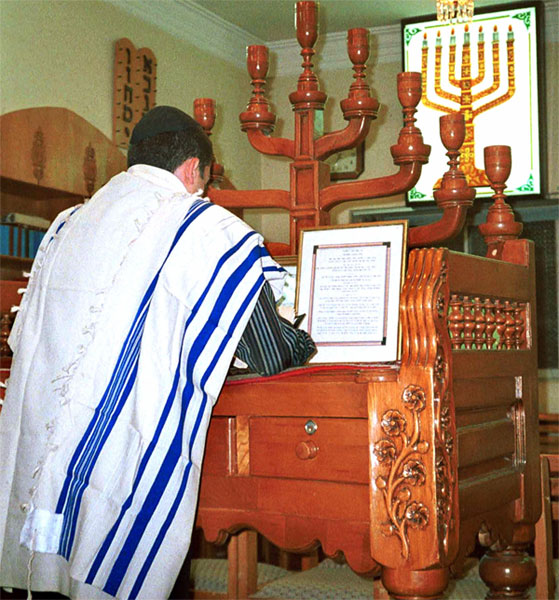
A Persian Jew prays in a synagogue in Shiraz, Iran, 1999.

Rabbis from the Haredi sect Neturei Karta, which has historically been opposed to the existence of Israel have visited Iran on several occasions. The Jewish Defense Organization, protested against one such visit by members of a Neturei Karta faction after they attended International Conference to Review the Global Vision of the Holocaust in Tehran.

Maurice Motamed, a former Jewish Iranian parliamentarian states that in recent years, the Iranian government has allowed Jewish Iranians to visit their family members in Israel and it has also allowed those Iranians who are living in Israel to return to Iran for a visit.

Limited cultural contacts are also allowed, such as the March 2006 Jewish folk dance festival in Russia, in which a female team from Iran participated.

Iranian Jews are generally allowed to travel to Israel and emigrate abroad, though they must submit passport and visa requests to a special section of the passport office, face restrictions on families leaving en masse, and travels to Israel must be done via a third country. However, the rate of emigration has been low. Between October 2005 and September 2006, 152 Jews left Iran, down from 297 during the same period the previous year, and 183 the year before that. Most of those who left allegedly cited economic and family reasons as their main incentives for leaving. In July 2007, Iran's Jewish community rejected financial emigration incentives to leave Iran. Offers ranging from 5,000 to 30,000 British pounds, financed by a wealthy expatriate Jew with the support of the Israeli government, were turned down by Iran's Jewish leaders. To place the incentives in perspective, the sums offered were up to 3 times or more than the average annual income for an Iranian. However, in late 2007 at least forty Iranian Jews accepted financial incentives offered by Jewish charities for immigrating to Israel.

=== Synagogues and Hebrew schools ===
Most Jews live in Tehran, the capital. Today Tehran has 11 functioning synagogues, many of them with Hebrew schools. It has two kosher restaurants, an old-age home and a cemetery. There is a Jewish library with 20,000 titles. Traditionally however, Shiraz, Hamedan, Isfahan, Tabriz, Nahawand, Babol and some other cities of Iran were home to large populations of Jews. Isfahan has a Jewish population of about 1,500, consisting mostly of businesspeople. As of 2015 there were 13 synagogues, including the primary synagogue on Palestine Square. In Esfahan, many Jewish businesses are concentrated in an area called "Jewish Passage".

In 2026, The Guardian reported the community maintains about 30 synagogues nationally.

=== Legal discrimination ===
Iranian Jews remain under various discriminatory legal restrictions regarding their position in society. Jews are prohibited from holding significant governmental and decision-making positions. A Jew may not serve on the Guardian Council, as President, or as a military commander. Jews may not serve as judges, and aside from the seat reserved for a Jew in the Majlis, Jews may not become a member of the Majlis through general elections. A Jew may not inherit property from a Muslim. By law, if one member of a Jewish family converts to Islam, that person inherits all family property. Jews also do not have equal rights to Qisas, or retribution, in the Iranian judicial system. For example, if a Jew were to kill a Muslim, the family of the victim would have the right to ask that the death penalty be imposed, but if a Muslim kills a Jew, the penalty would be left to the discretion of the judges with the wishes of the victim's family carrying no legal weight.

=== Islamic curriculum ===
In 1996, there were still three schools in Tehran in which Jews were in a majority, but Jewish principals had been replaced. The school curriculum is Islamic and the Tanakh is taught in Persian, rather than Hebrew. The Ozar Hatorah organization conducts Hebrew lessons on Fridays. The government monitors activities in Jewish schools to ensure that the main language of education is Persian and not Hebrew.

In principle, but with some exceptions, there is little restriction of or interference with the Jewish religious practice; however, education of Jewish children has become more difficult in recent years. The government reportedly allows Hebrew instruction, recognizing that it is necessary for Jewish religious practice. However, it strongly discourages the distribution of Hebrew texts, in practice making it difficult to teach the language. Moreover, the government has required that several Jewish schools remain open on Saturdays, the Jewish Sabbath, in conformity with the schedule of other schools in the school system. Since certain kinds of work (such as writing or using electrical appliances) on the Sabbath violates Jewish law, this requirement to operate the schools has made it difficult for observant Jews both to attend school and adhere to a fundamental tenet of their religion.

=== Ancient Jewish sites ===
Many cities in Iran have Jewish sites or sites related to Judaism in some way. Prominent among these are Tomb of Esther and Mordechai in Hamadan, Tomb of Daniel in Susa, Tomb of Habakkuk in Tuyserkan and the Peyghambarieh mausoleum in Qazvin.

There is a pilgrimage site near Isfahan (Pir Bakran) dedicated to Serah.

There are also tombs of several outstanding Jewish scholars in Iran such as Harav Ohr Shraga in Yazd and Hakham Mullah Moshe Halevi (Moshe-Ha-Lavi), a 16th-century scholar, in Kashan, which are also visited by Muslim pilgrims.

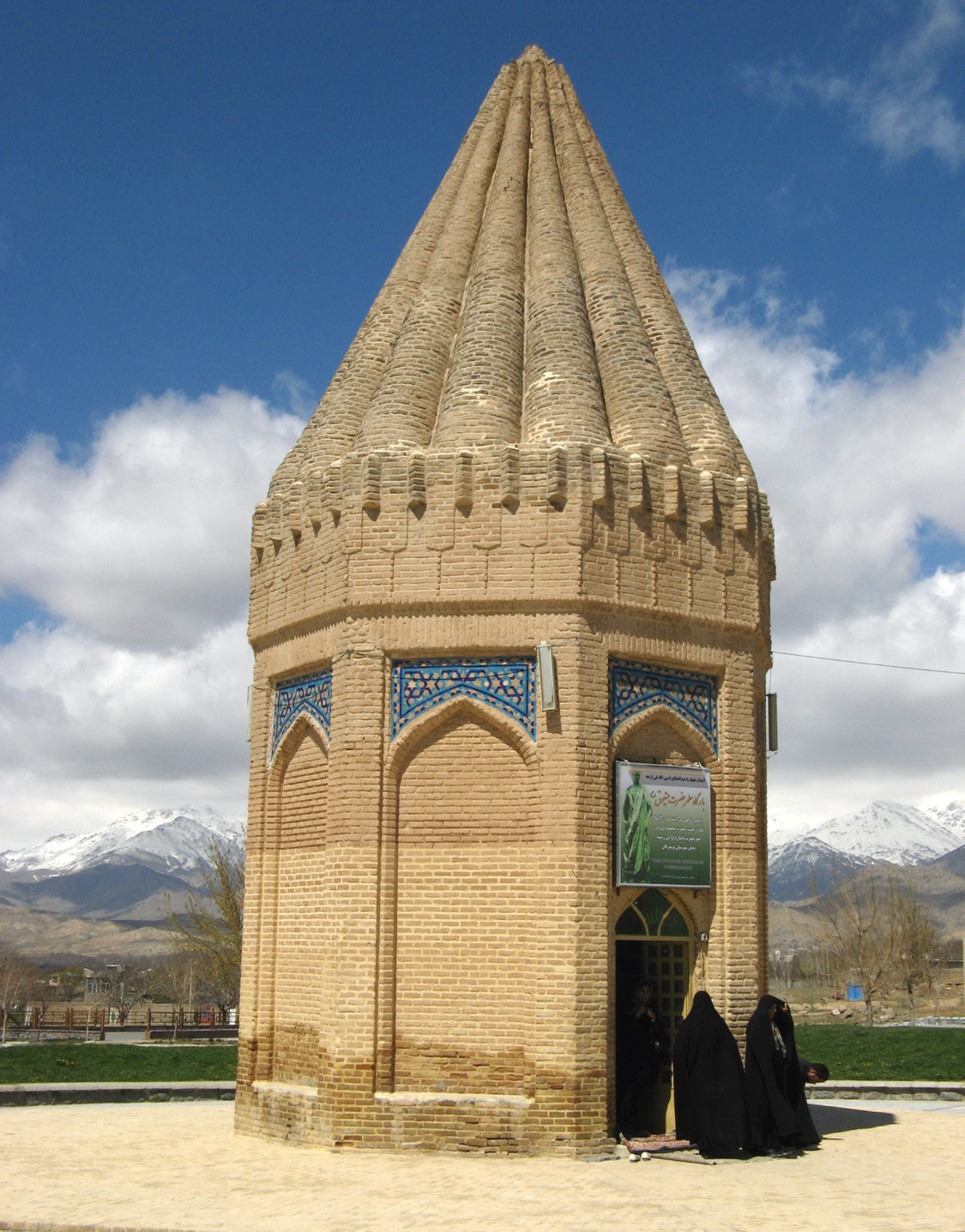
The shrine of Habakkuk in Toyserkan

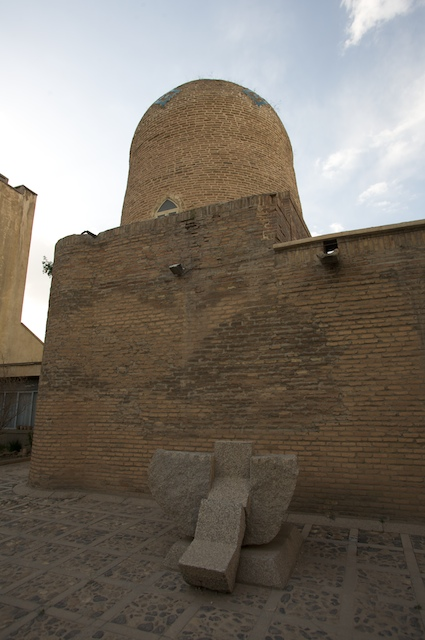
The Tomb of Esther and Mordechai in Hamadan

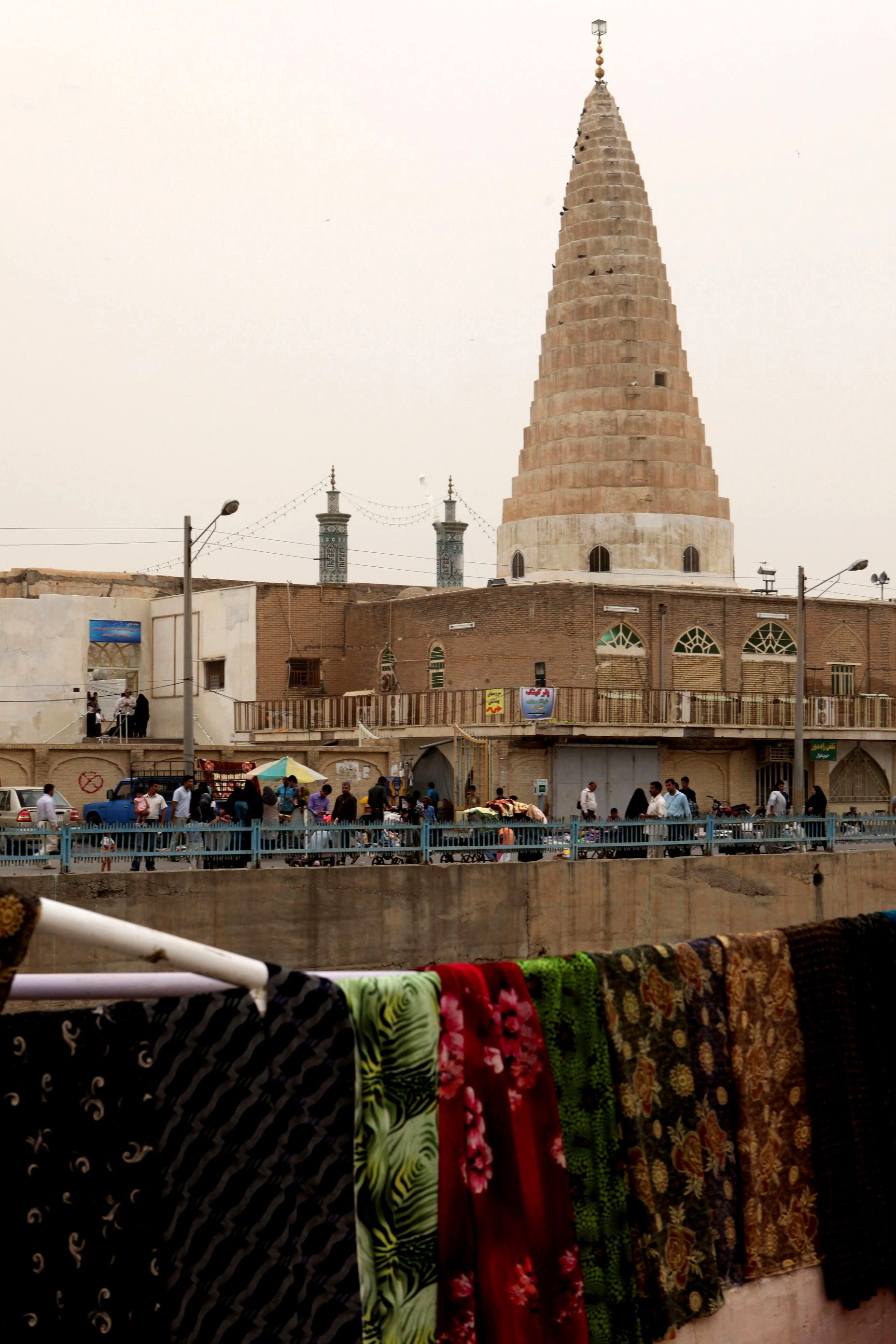
The Shrine of Daniel in Susa

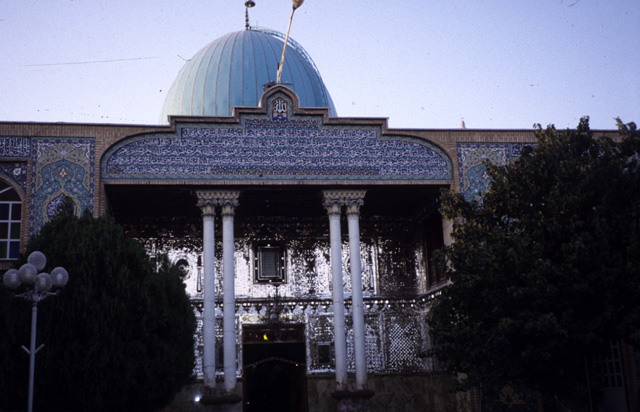
Peyghambarieh ("the place of the prophets"), Qazvin: Here, four Jewish prophets are said to be buried. Their Arabic names are Salam, Solum, al-Qiya, and Sohuli.

On 16 December 2014, authorities in Tehran unveiled a monument to slain Iranian Jewish soldiers who died during the country's war with Iraq between 1980 and 1988. Banners showed the images of fallen soldiers, hailed as "martyrs" in Farsi and Hebrew inscriptions. "We are not tenants in this country. We are Iranians, and we have been for 30 centuries," said Siamak Moresadegh, the at the time Iranian Jewish parliamentarian. "There is a distinction between us as Jews and Israel," added a shopkeeper in the historic city of Isfahan. "We consider ourselves Iranian Jews, and it has nothing to do with Israel whatsoever. This is the country we love."
The tombs of Mordechai and Esther were desecrated during the Gaza war.

In the Iranian-Jewish diaspora, efforts have been made to document and digitally preserve the community’s history, sites, and culture. One such project is 7dorim.com, a mostly Persian language website and independent non-profit research center launched in 2007 by Iranian-born businessman, Yousef Setareh-Shenas, based in Los Angeles. The site archives photographs of synagogues and historical Jewish sites in Iran (including the tombs associated with Esther and Mordechai), cemetery records, biographies of prominent community members, Judeo-Persian dialect materials and dictionaries, videos, historical documents and related cultural resources. The project draws on research conducted in Iran and contributions from community members

== Demographics ==
The Jewish Encyclopedia estimated that in 1900 there were 35,000 Persian Jews in Iran (almost all of whom lived in present-day Iran), although other sources estimate somewhat higher numbers for the same time. On the eve of Israel's independence in 1948, there were, by varying estimates, 100,000–150,000 Jews in Iran with relatively few Persian Jews residing outside the country. Today, there are an estimated 300,000–350,000 Jews of full or partial Persian ancestry living predominantly in Israel, with significant communities in the United States and Iran.

Iranian Jews also emigrated to form smaller communities in Western Europe (in particular Paris and London), and in Australia, Canada, and South America. A number of groups of Jews of Persia have split off since ancient times. They have been identified as separate communities, such as the Mountain Jews. In addition, there are a large number of people in Iran who are, or who are the direct descendants of, Jews who converted to other religions, including Christianity, Islam, or the Baháʼí faith.

=== Iran ===
Iran's Jewish population was reduced from 150,000 to 100,000 in 1948 to about 80,000 immediately before the Iranian Revolution, due mostly to immigration to Israel. While immigration to Israel had slowed in the 1970s and the Jewish population of Iran had stabilized, the majority of Iran's remaining Jews left the country in the aftermath of the overthrow of the Shah. In the 2000s, the Jewish population of Iran was estimated by most sources to be 25,000, (sources date from 2006, 2007, and 2008, respectively) though estimates varied, with some as high as 40,000 in 1998. and some as low as 17,000 by 2010 However, the official census in August 2012 indicated that there were only 8,756 Jews still living in Iran. In the 2016 Iranian census, the remaining Jewish population of Iran was 9,826 As of 2021, only 8,500 Jews still live in Iran. After Israel, it is home to the second-largest Jewish population in the Middle East. Notable population centers include Tehran, Isfahan (1,200), and Shiraz. Historically, Jews maintained a presence in many more Iranian cities. Jews are protected in the Iranian constitution and allowed one seat in the Majlis.

=== Israel ===
The largest group of Persian Jews is found in Israel. As of 2007, Israel is home to just over 47,000 Iranian-born Jews and roughly 87,000 Israeli-born Jews with fathers born in Iran. While these numbers add up to about 135,000, when Israelis with more distant or solely maternal Iranian roots are included the total number of Persian Jews in Israel is estimated to be between 200,000–250,000.

A June 2009 Los Angeles Times blog article about Iranian-Israeli Jews showing solidarity with the Iranian protestors said, "The Israeli community of Iranian Jews numbers about 170,000 – including the first generation of Israeli-born – and is deeply proud of its roots." The largest concentration of Persian Jews in Israel is found in the city Holon. In Israel, Persian Jews are classified as Mizrahim. Both former President Moshe Katsav and former Minister of Defense and former head of the opposition in the Knesset Shaul Mofaz are of Persian Jewish origin. Katsav was born in Yazd and Mofaz was born in Tehran.

Since at least the 1980s, Iranian Jews in Israel have traditionally tended to vote Likud.

=== United States ===
The United States is home to 60,000–80,000 Iranian Jews, most of whom have settled in the Greater Los Angeles area, in Great Neck, New York and Baltimore, Maryland. Those in metropolitan Los Angeles have settled mostly in the affluent Westside cities of Beverly Hills and Santa Monica and the Los Angeles Westside neighborhoods of Brentwood, Westwood, and West Los Angeles, as well as the San Fernando Valley communities of Tarzana and Encino.

==== Beverly Hills ====
In particular, Persian Jews make up a sizeable proportion of the population of Beverly Hills, California. Persian Jews constitute a great percentage of the 26% of the total population of Beverly Hills that identifies as Iranian-American. Following the 1979 Iranian Revolution, tens of thousands of Persian Jews migrated from Iran, forming one of the wealthiest waves of immigrants to ever come to the United States. The community is credited with revitalizing Beverly Hills and re-developing its architecture, and for the development of ornate mansions across the city.

According to the US Census Bureau's 2010 American Community Survey, 26% of Beverly Hills' 34,000 residents are of Iranian origin. On 21 March 2007, Jimmy Delshad, a Persian Jew who immigrated to the United States in 1958, became the Mayor of Beverly Hills. This election made Delshad one of the highest ranking elected Iranian-American officials in the United States. He once again took the post of mayor of Beverly Hills on 16 March 2010.

Prominent Persian Jewish congregations in the Los Angeles area include Nessah Synagogue and the Eretz-Siamak Cultural Center. Persian Jews also constitute a large part of the membership at Sinai Temple in Westwood, one of the largest Conservative congregations in the United States.

The Iranian American Jewish Federation (IAJF) of Los Angeles is a prominent non-profit organization that has been serving the Iranian Jewish community of Greater Los Angeles for the last forty-one years. IAJF is a leading organization in their efforts to fight local and global Antisemitism, protect Iranian Jews domestically and abroad, promote a unified community, participating in social and public affairs, provide financial and psychosocial assistance to those in need through philanthropic activities, and more.

==== New York ====
Kings Point, a village constituting part of Great Neck, has the greatest percentage of Iranians in the United States (approximately 40%). Unlike the Iranian community in Los Angeles, which contains a large number of non-Jewish Iranians, the Iranian population in and around Great Neck is almost entirely Jewish.

Several thousand of the Great Neck area's 10,000 Iranian Jews trace their origins to the Iranian city of Mashhad, constituting the largest Mashhadi community in the United States. Many Mashhadi crypto-Jews made their Jewish observances more public again following the rise of the secular Pahlavi dynasty upon performing them privately for almost a century. The Mashadi community in Great Neck operates its own synagogues and community centers, and members typically marry within the community.

The Iranian American Jewish Federation (IAJF) of New York has been serving the Iranian Jewish community for the last sixteen years. The organization's goal is to be a unifier amongst Iranian Jews in the Greater New York metropolitan area and engagement in philanthropic activities.

== Related Jewish communities ==
=== Mountain Jews ===
The Mountain Jews of Azerbaijan and the North Caucasus (primarily Dagestan) are direct descendants of Iranian Jews. They took shape as a community after Qajar Iran ceded the areas in which they lived to the Russian Empire as part of the Treaty of Gulistan of 1813. However, they maintained a Judeo-Persian language that shares a great deal of vocabulary and structure with modern Persian. Most Azerbaijani Jews have immigrated to Israel since Azerbaijan gained independence.

=== Bukharian Jews ===
Bukharian Jews traditionally spoke a dialect of Judeo-Persian and lived primarily the region of Central Asia (today modern day Uzbekistan and Tajikistan). Until the start of the 16th century, the Jews of Iran and Central Asia constituted one community. However, during the Safavid dynasty, Iran adopted the Shia branch of Islam, while Central Asia retained their allegiance to the Sunni branch of Islam. Due to the hostile relationship between the neighboring states because of this, the links between the Jews of the area were severed, and the Jewish community was divided into two similar but separate communities. Most Bukharian Jews have immigrated to Israel or the United States since the collapse of the Soviet Union.

=== Lakhloukh Jews ===
There are estimated to be approximately four dozen Persian Jewish families living in Kazakhstan, which call themselves Lakhloukh and speak Aramaic. They still hold identity papers from Iran, the country their ancestors left almost 80 years ago. These Persian Jews lived near the border of Iran and commonly practiced trade to sustain their communities. The most popular Lakhloukh Jewish family being the Malihi family, whom are all descendants of Jaha Malihi (A noble in the Persian Empire)

== Languages ==
Iranian Jews speak standard Persian, Kurdish, and other Iranian languages as their primary tongue, but various Jewish languages have been associated with the community over time. They include:

- Dzhidi (Judæo-Persian)
- Bukhori (Judæo-Bukharic)
- Judæo-Golpaygani
- Judæo-Shirazi
- Judæo-Hamedani
- Juhuri language (Judæo-Tat)
- Judæo-Kashani

In addition, Iranian Jews in Israel generally speak Hebrew, and Iranian Jews elsewhere will tend to speak the local language (e.g. English in the United States) with sprinkles of Persian and Hebrew.

Many Jews from the Northwest area of Iran speak Lishán Didán or other various dialects of Jewish Neo-Aramaic. Jews from Urmia, Tabriz, Sanandaj, Saqqez, and some other cities all speak various dialects that may or may not be intelligible to each other. There are less than 5,000 known speakers today and the language faces extinction in the next few decades.

== Genetics ==
Genetic studies show that the MtDNA of Persian Jews descend from a small number of female ancestors.

Another study of L. Hao et al. studied seven groups of Jewish populations with different geographic origin (Ashkenazi, Italian, Greek, Turkish, Iranian, Iraqi, and Syrian) and showed that the individuals all shared a common Middle Eastern background, although they were also genetically distinguishable from each other. In public comments, Harry Ostrer, the director of the Human Genetics Program at New York University Langone Medical Center, and one of the authors of this study, concluded, "We have shown that Jewishness can be identified through genetic analysis, so the notion of a Jewish people is plausible."

An autosomal DNA study carried out in 2010 by Atzmon et al. examined the origin of Iranian, Iraqi, Syrian, Turkish, Greek, Sephardic, and Ashkenazi Jewish communities. The study compared these Jewish groups with 1043 unrelated individuals from 52 worldwide populations. To further examine the relationship between Jewish communities and European populations, 2407 European subjects were assigned and divided into 10 groups based on geographic region of their origin. This study confirmed previous findings of shared Middle Eastern origin of the above Jewish groups and found that "the genetic connections between the Jewish populations became evident from the frequent identity by descent (IBD) across these Jewish groups (63% of all shared segments). Jewish populations shared more and longer segments with one another than with non-Jewish populations, highlighting the commonality of Jewish origin. Among pairs of populations ordered by total sharing, 12 out of the top 20 were pairs of Jewish populations, and "none of the top 30 paired a Jewish population with a non-Jewish one". Atzmon concludes that "Each Jewish group demonstrated Middle Eastern ancestry and variable admixture from host population, while the split between Middle Eastern and European/Syrian Jews, calculated by simulation and comparison of length distributions of IBD segments, occurred 100–150 generations ago, which was described as "compatible with a historical divide that is reported to have occurred more than 2500 years ago" as the Jewish community in Iraq and Iran were formed by Jews in the Babylonian and Persian empires during and after Babylonian exile. The main difference between Mizrahi and Ashkenazi/Sephardic Jews was the absence of Southern European components in the former. According to these results, European/Syrian Jewish populations, including the Ashkenazi Jewish community, were formed later, as a result of the expulsion and migration of Jews from the Land of Israel, during Roman rule. Concerning Ashkenazi Jews, this study found that genetic dates "are incompatible with theories that Ashkenazi Jews are for the most part the direct lineal descendants of converted Khazars or Slavs". Citing Behar, Atzmon states that "Evidence for founder females of Middle Eastern origin has been observed in all Jewish populations based on non-overlapping mitochondrial haplotypes with coalescence times >2000 years". The closest people related to Jewish groups were the Palestinians, Bedouins, Druze, Greeks, and Italians. Regarding this relationship, the authors conclude that "These observations are supported by the significant overlap of Y chromosomal haplogroups between Israeli and Palestinian Arabs with Ashkenazi and non-Ashkenazi Jewish populations".

In 2011, Moorjani et al. detected 3%–5% sub-Saharan African ancestry in all eight of the diverse Jewish populations (Ashkenazi Jews, Syrian Jews, Iranian Jews, Iraqi Jews, Greek Jews, Turkish Jews, Italian Jews) that they analyzed. The timing of this African admixture among all Jewish populations was identical The exact date was not determined, but it was estimated to have taken place between 1,600 (4th Century AD) and 3,400 (14th Century BC) years ago. Although African admixture was determined among some South European and Near Eastern populations too, this admixture was found to be younger compared to the Jewish populations. This findings the authors explained as evidence regarding common origin of these 8 main Jewish groups. "It is intriguing that the Mizrahi Iranian and Iraqi Jews—who are thought to descend at least in part from Jews who were exiled to Babylon about 2,600 years ago share the signal of African admixture. A parsimonious explanation for these observations is that they reflect a history in which many of the Jewish groups descend from a common ancestral population which was itself admixed with Africans (most likely Ancient Egyptians), prior to the beginning of the Jewish diaspora that occurred in 8th to 6th century BC[E]" the authors concludes.

=== Medical conditions ===
Patients with prolonged paralysis following administration of the anaesthetic succinylcholine are often diagnosed with Pseudocholinesterase deficiency which is a clinically silent condition in individuals who are not exposed to exogenous sources of choline esters. One possible outcome beyond prolonged general paralysis is paralysis of the muscles control respiratory function. This condition is found in the general population at a rate of 1 in 3000, while the condition is found in Persian Jews at a rate of 1 in 10.

== Notable Iranian Jews ==
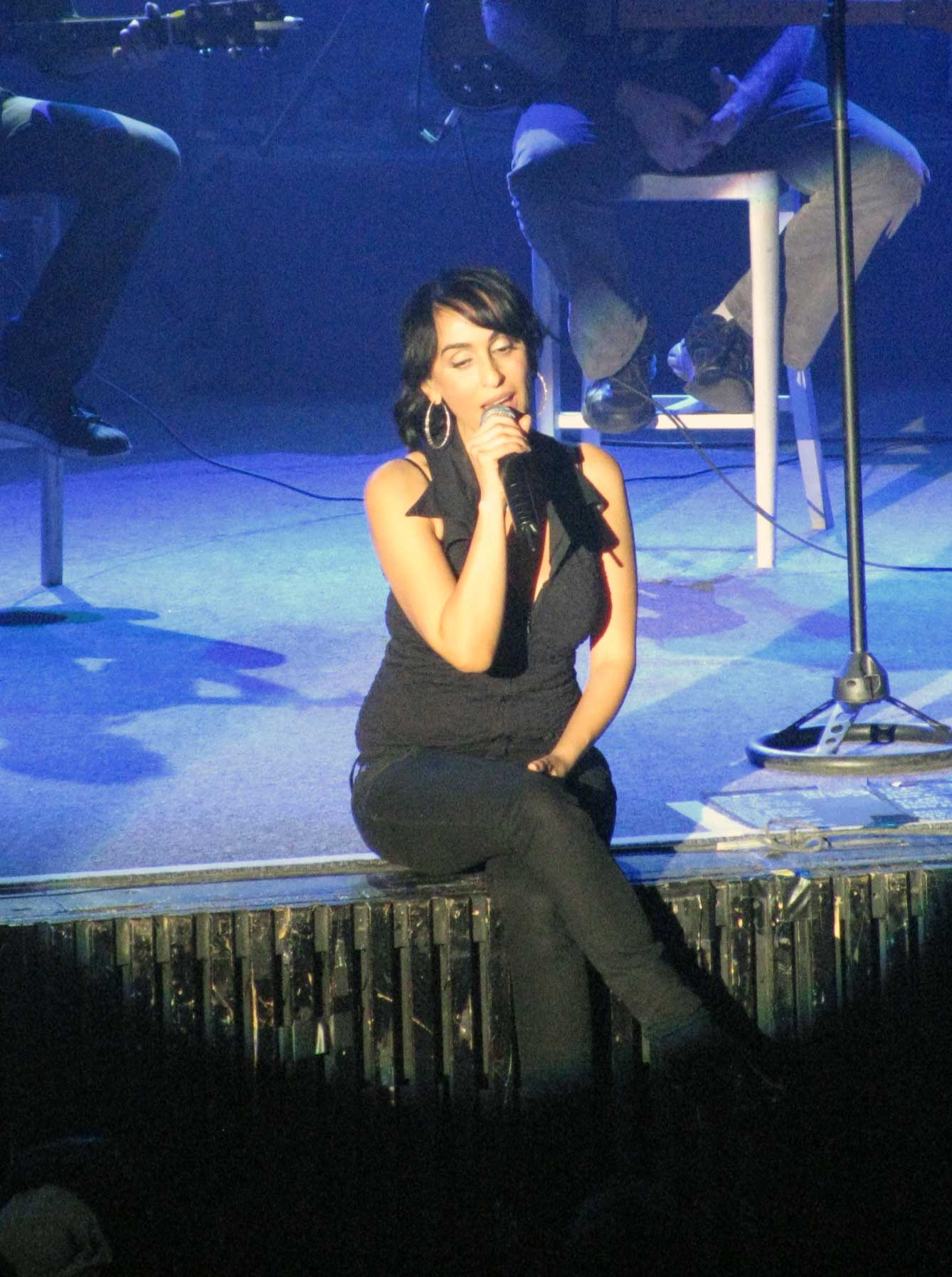
Rita Jahanforuz, an Israeli pop star of Iranian descent

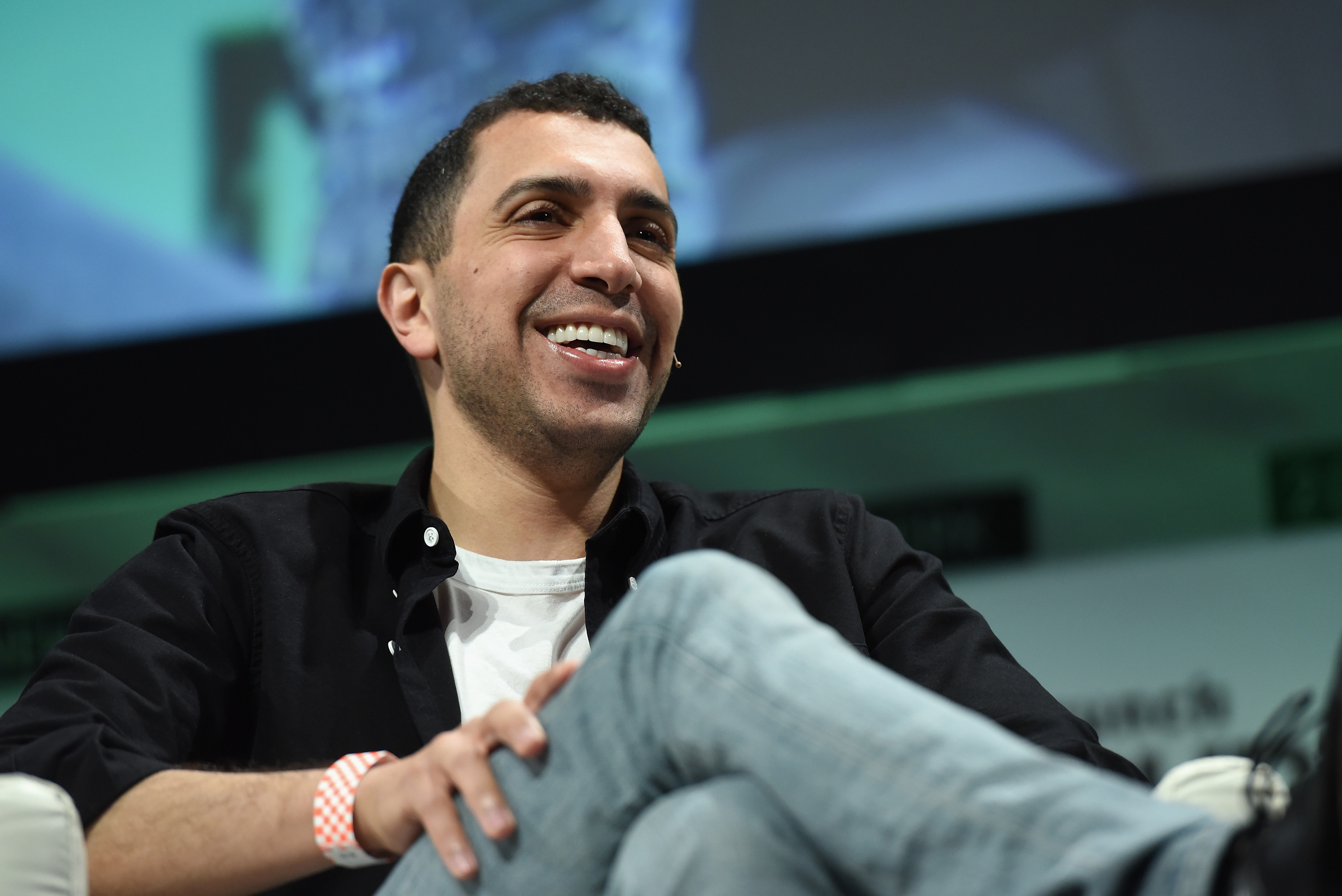
Sean Rad, founder of Tinder

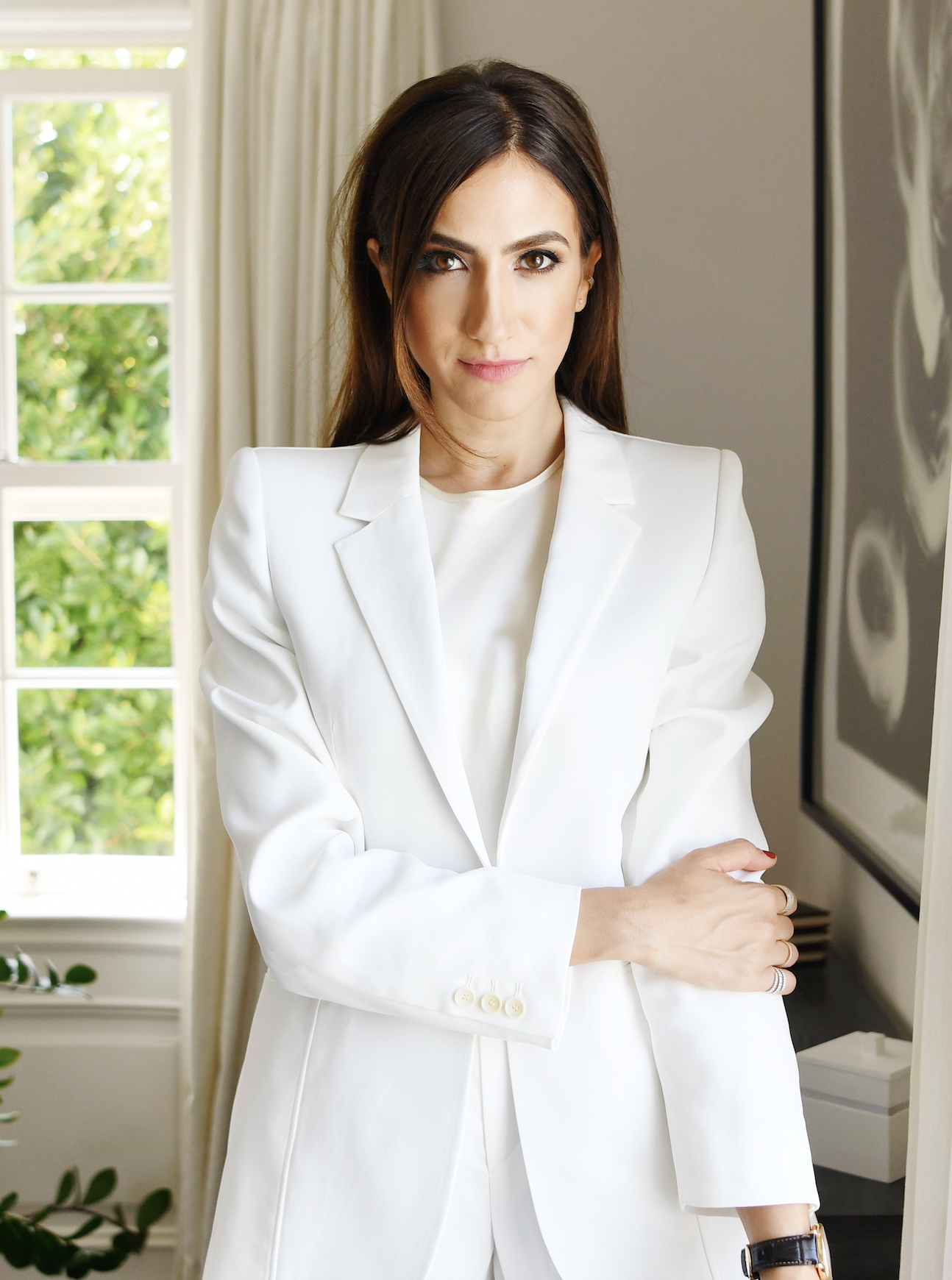
Mandana Dayani, activist and entrepreneur

=== Pre-modern era ===
- Mashallah ibn Athari –Jewish astrologer and astronomer of the early Abbasid period
- Sa'ad al-Dawla – Jewish physician and vizier of the Ilkhan Arghun
- Rashid al-Din Hamadani– historian and vizier; born Jewish, later converted to Islam
- Benjamin Nahawandi – Karaite scholar of the early Middle Ages from Nahavand
- Meulana Shahin Shirazi – Judeo-Persian poet
- Abu Ubaidah – religious scholar, “Jewish origin” is widely treated as a polemic against him
- Ibn al-Rawandi – prominent philosopher, religious scholar, his father converted to Islam
- Shushandukht – Sassanian queen in Jewish and Iranian tradition; said to be mother of Bahram V
- Ifra Hormizd – mother of Shapur II ; Jewish or half-Jewish in Talmudic tradition
- Maryam Khanom – Qajar consort of documented Jewish origin
- Masarjawaih – Jewish physician and translator
- Abu Isa of Isfahan– Jewish sectarian leader
- Qavam family of Shiraz — aristocratic family during the Qajar dynasty ; Jewish origin is reported in local tradition and some 19th- century sources, and is not independently proved
- Imrani – Judeo-Persian poet
- Yudghan – Jewish religious leader from Hamadan
- Baba'i ben Lotf – Judeo-Persian poet, first Judeo-Persian chronicler
- Baba'i ben Farhad - 2nd Judeo-Persian chronicler
- Daniel al-Kumisi – prominent scholar of Karaite Judaism from Qumis (Kumis)

=== Politics and military ===
- David Alliance, Baron Alliance – Iranian-born British businessman; Liberal Democrat politician
- Michael Ben-Ari – Israeli politician and former member of the Knesset
- Makan Delrahim – United States Assistant Attorney General for the United States Department of Justice Antitrust Division under the Trump Administration
- Jimmy Delshad – Iranian-American former two-term mayor of Beverly Hills
- Manuchehr Eliasi – former Jewish member of the Majlis
- Eitan Ben Eliyahu – former Major General in the Israeli Defence Forces
- Aziz Daneshrad – political activist
- Dan Halutz – former chief of staff of the Israel Defense Forces
- Anna Kaplan – American politician and member of the New York State Senate
- Moshe Katsav – former President of Israel
- Shaul Mofaz – former Israeli Minister of Defense
- Maurice Motamed – former Jewish member of the Majlis of Iran
- David Nahai – former head of the Los Angeles Department of Water and Power
- Abie Nathan – humanitarian and peace activist
- Siamak Moreh Sedgh – Jewish member of the Majlis of Iran
- Haroun Yashayaei – chairman of the board of the Tehran Jewish Committee and leader of Iran's Jewish community
- Mordechai Zar – Israeli politician and former member of the Knesset
- Ellie Cohanim – Deputy Special Envoy to Monitor and Combat Anti-Semitism at the United States Department of State
- Dalya Attar – American politician
- Moshfegh Hamadani – political journalist
- Tali Farhadian – attorney and politician
- Esther Shkalim – Israeli poet, researcher
- Shmuel Hayyim – journalist, politician
- Shula Keshet – political activist and writer
- Nitsana Darshan-Leitner – attorney, activist
- Meirav Ben-Ari – Israeli politician, member of the Knesset
- Sharon Nazarian – Iranian-born Senior Vice President of International Affairs for the ADL
- David Rokni – Israeli colonel
- Galit Distel-Atbaryan – Israeli politician, member of the Knesset
- Eliezer Avtabi – former Israeli politician
- Sharon Roffe Ofir – Israeli journalist and politician
- David Peyman – attorney, worked for the United States Department of State

=== Science, academia, and medicine ===
- Abbas Amanat – professor of history at Yale University (born to a family of Jewish descent)
- Shaul Bakhash – professor of Iranian studies at George Mason University
- Aaron Cohen-Gadol – neurosurgeon specializing in surgical treatment of brain tumors and aneurysms
- Farshid Delshad – historical-comparative linguistics in German
- Pejman Salimpour – professor, physician
- Pedram Salimpour – physician, entrepreneur
- Avshalom Elitzur – physicist and philosopher
- Soleiman Haim – compiled an early and influential Persian language dictionary
- Hakim Yazghel Haqnazar – court physician
- Iraj Lalezari – academic and chemist
- Habib Levy – historian best known for his extensive research on the history of Jews in Iran; author of Comprehensive History of the Jews of Iran: The Outset of the Diaspora.
- Amnon Netzer – professor of the history and culture of Iranian Jews
- Samuel Rahbar – discoverer of HbA1C
- David B. Samadi – expert in robotic oncology
- Saba Soomekh – professor of religious studies and Middle Eastern History at UCLA, and author of books on Iranian Jewish culture
- Moussa B. H. Youdim – Israeli neurologist, neuropharmacologist
- Armin Tehrany – orthopedic surgeon
- Sheila Nazarian – plastic surgeon and television personality
- Simon Ourian – plastic surgeon
- Ehsan Yarshater – historian & founder of the Encyclopedia Iranica (born to Jewish parents who converted to the Baháʼí Faith)

=== Business and economics ===
- David Alliance – British businessman
- Mike Amiri – American fashion designer
- Asadollah Asgaroladi – Iranian billionaire (convert to Islam)
- Habibollah Asgaroladi – leading Iranian conservative politician (convert to Islam)
- Jon Bakhshi – American restaurateur
- J. Darius Bikoff – founder and CEO of Energy Brands
- Mandana Dayani – Iranian-American attorney, entrepreneur
- Henry Elghanayan – real estate developer New York City
- Habib Elghanian – prominent businessman executed by the Islamic Republic
- Ghermezian family – billionaire shopping mall developers
- Manucher Ghorbanifar – former SAVAK agent, central figure in the Iran–Contra affair
- Kamran Hakim – real estate developer in New York City
- Moussa Kermanian – real estate developer in Los Angeles and journalist
- Neil Kadisha – businessman
- Nasser David Khalili – billionaire property developer and art collector
- Saul Maslavi – president and CEO of Jovani Fashion
- Isaac Larian – American billionaire, chief executive officer of MGA Entertainment
- Justin Mateen – co-founder and former chief marketing officer of Tinder dating app
- David Merage – co-founder of Hot Pockets snack food company
- Paul Merage – co-founder of Hot Pockets snack food company
- Joseph Moinian – New York City real estate developer
- Ezri Namvar – Iranian-born businessman and convicted criminal
- Fred Ohebshalom – founder of Empire Management Real Estate
- Joseph Parnes – investment advisor
- Erwin David Rabhan – businessman, longtime friend of Jimmy Carter
- Sean Rad – co-founder and former CEO of Tinder dating app
- Assadollah Rashidian – businessman, played a critical role in the 1953 Overthrow of Mohammed Mossadegh
- Nouriel Roubini – economist
- Ben Shaoul – co-founder of Magnum Real Estate Group
- Joel Simkhai – founder of Grindr dating app
- Mahbod Moghadam – co-founder of Everipedia, co-founder of Genius
- Sam Mizrahi – Canadian real estate developer
- Victor Haghani – American financier
- Fraydun Manocherian – Manhattan real estate developer
- Richard Saghian – Founder of Fashion Nova
- Mike Kohan – founder of Kohan Retail Investment Group
- Habib Sabet – Iranian industrialist (convert to the Bahá'í Faith)
- Essie Sakhai – art dealer, businessman
- Ely Sakhai – art dealer, owner of several Lower Manhattan art galleries
- Sasson Khakshouri – businessman, founder of the international Kremlin Cup
- Jack Mahfar – Iranian-born businessman
- Albert Hakim – businessman, figure in the Iran–Contra affair
- Sam Eshaghoff – American real estate developer
- Eli Zelkha – entrepreneur, venture capitalist, professor, and inventor of ambient intelligence

=== Art and entertainment ===
- Isaac Larian – creator of Bratz dolls
- Dan Ahdoot – stand-up comedian
- Jonathan Ahdout – actor
- Hossein Amanat – architect, designer of the Azadi Tower in Tehran (born to a family of Jewish descent that converted to the Baháʼí Faith)
- Jojo Anavim – artist
- Yossi Banai – Israeli performer, singer, and actor
- Richard Danielpour – composer
- Yuval Delshad – film director
- David Diaan – actor, producer, screenwriter
- Irán Eory – Iranian-born Mexican actress and model
- Chohreh Feyzdjou – French-Iranian painter
- Hamid Gabbay – Iranian-born architect
- Roya Hakakian – writer and poet
- Mor Karbasi – singer
- Kamran Khavarani – architect, painter
- Harmony Korine – director, screenwriter
- Ben Maddahi – prominent American music executive
- Faranak Margolese – writer, best known as author of Off the Derech
- Jamie Masada – comedian and businessman. Founder of the Laugh Factory
- Heshmat Moayyad – writer, translator (convert to Bahá'í Faith)
- Dora Levy Mossanen – author of historical fiction
- Moze Mossanen – Canadian film director and producer
- Ottessa Moshfegh – American author
- Gina Nahai – writer
- Morteza Neidavoud – musician
- Adi Nes – photographer
- Dorit Rabinyan – Israeli writer, screenwriter
- Rita – Israeli pop star
- Maer Roshan – writer, entrepreneur
- Hooshang Seyhoun – prominent Iranian architect (convert to the Bahá'í Faith)
- Lior Shamriz – filmmaker
- Shahram Shiva – performance poet
- Dalia Sofer – writer
- Sarah Solemani – English actress
- Bahar Soomekh – Iranian-born American actress
- Tami Stronach – choreographer
- Subliminal – Israeli hip-hop singer
- The Shadow – Israeli hip-hop singer and right-wing activist
- Elie Tahari – high-end fashion designer
- Shaun Toub – Iranian-born American actor, recipient of the Sephard award at the Los Angeles Sephardic Film Festival
- Elham Yaghoubian- writer
- Bob Yari – film producer

=== Religious figures ===
- Eliyahu Bakshi-Doron – previous Sephardic Chief Rabbi of Israel
- Shmuley Boteach – American rabbi
- Yousef Hamadani Cohen – former chief rabbi of Iran
- Uriel Davidi – former chief rabbi of Iran
- Lutfu'lláh Hakím – Baháʼí leader (born to a family of Jewish descent that converted to the Baháʼí Faith)
- Yosef Mizrachi – Israeli-American rabbi
- Menahem Shemuel Halevy – Iranian rabbi
- Yedidia Shofet – former chief rabbi of Iran
- Younes Hamami Lalehzar – prominent religious leader
- Eliyahu Ben Haim – Sephardic rabbi
- Ben Zion Abba Shaul – rabbi, religious scholar
- Ezra Zion Melamed – biblical scholar

=== Miscellaneous ===
- Menashe Amir – Persian-language broadcaster in Israel
- Soleyman Binafard – wrestler
- Hanina Mizrahi – educator, public figure
- Ezra Frech – American Paralympic athlete
- Janet Kohan-Sedq – track and field athlete
- Shamsi Hekmat – women's rights activist who pioneered reforms on women's status in Iran. Founded the first Iranian Jewish women's organization (Sazman Banovan Yahud i Iran) in 1947.
- Leandra Medine – author, blogger, and humor writer best known for Man Repeller, an independent fashion and lifestyle website
- Homa Sarshar – journalist, author, and feminist activist. Columnist for Zan-e-Ruz magazine Kayhan daily newspaper (1964–1973)
- Albert Elay Shaltiel – philanthropist, founder and director of ILAI Fund
- Houshang Mashian – Iranian-Israeli chess master
- Eliezer Kashani – member of Irgun
- Eli Avivi – founder of the micronation Akhzivland

== See also ==
- Iran–Israel relations
- History of the Jews in Iran
- Exodus of Iranian Jews
- History of the Jews under Muslim rule
- Jewish exodus from the Muslim world
- Antisemitism in Islam
- Islamic–Jewish relations
- Judæo-Iranian languages
- Judæo-Persian languages
- Judeo-Persian dialects
- Kaifeng Jews – a small community of Persian Jewish descent which lives in Kaifeng, a city in the Henan province of China
- List of Asian Jews
- Mandaeans
- Mountain Jews
- Persian people
- Purim
- Religious minorities in Iran
- Allahdad incident
- Shiraz blood libel
- Tehran Jewish Committee
- Dr. Sapir Hospital and Charity Center
- List of Chief Rabbis of Iran
- List of synagogues in Iran
- List of Synagogues in Tehran
- Jews of Iran
- 30 Years After
- Madare sefr darajeh
- International Holocaust Cartoon Competition
