= Arvin Ghahremani =

Iranian Jew executed by Iranian government

Arvin Nathaniel Ghahremani (Hebrew: ארווין נתנאל בן סיונה) (Death on 4 November 2024) was an Iranian Jew who was sentenced to death on charges of premeditated murder.

He was the first Jewish person executed in Iran since 1994. The case prompted global condemnation, including from Israel and the U.S. Special Envoy on Antisemitism, and was viewed by many as emblematic of systemic discrimination against religious minorities in Iran.

== Background ==
Ghahremani was born in an Iranian Jewish family from Kermanshah, Iran. In November 2022, a dispute between Ghahremani and Amir Shokri, a Muslim man who owed Ghahremani money, occurred in the Ferdowsi neighborhood of Kermanshah, leading to Shokri's death.

There are two competing and unconfirmed versions of Shkori's killing, as no one else was present at the scene except the two men. Ghahremani's family claims that it was Shokri who came with a knife to attack Ghahremani, and that Ghahremani was forced to harm Shokri in self-defense.

In contrast, the Kermanshah provincial prosecutor claims that the killing was intentional. According to him, Ghahremani inflicted two blows to the head, one to the back, one to the chest, and finally a deep wound to Shokri's neck, tearing it from the back of his neck to his throat, and the combination of these blows caused Amir Shokri's death.

== Trial and execution ==
During his trial, supporters of Ghahremani, including political figures and human rights activists, expressed concerns that he was not receiving a fair trial. Deborah Lipstadt, U.S. Special Envoy to Monitor and Combat Antisemitism, expressed concerns that Ghahremani was not receiving a fair trial because he was Jewish. Concerns were also raised that elements of his defense were ignored during trial, including that he acted in self-defense and rendered aid to the injured party. Ghahremani's family contended that Ghahremani did not receive adequate representation by his lawyer, that "key errors in the case were intentionally ignored," and that Ghahremani's attempts to save the victim were not accounted for during the trial. Additionally, according to experts on Iran's judicial system and rights activists, Ghahremani was subjected to a discriminatory judicial system that prioritized Muslims over Jews.

Ghahremani was sentenced to qisas (a form of retributive justice in traditional Islamic law) for murder, with the execution to be carried out at Kermanshah Central Prison on 18 May 2024, which was later delayed until 20 May.

Under Iranian law, victims' relatives may accept a financial settlement as an alternative punishment. Initially, Shokri's family agreed to accept diya (blood money) in lieu of capital punishment; however, they subsequently retracted their decision and demanded Ghahremani's execution upon learning of his Jewish background, according to Iran Human Rights. Shokri's family repeatedly refused to accept $1 million in diyat, and multiple attempts by Kermanshah Kalimian Association, the Jewish community in Kermanshah, to mediate with Islamic officials and through Iran's Council for Dispute Resolution were unsuccessful.

The community also made appeals to the governments of Russia and Germany. Global Jewish communities raised over $1.5 million and offered to build a mosque in the name of the deceased.

On 19 May, Ghahremani received a one-month stay of execution following a global pressure campaign, including by Persian Jewish communities around the world and human rights organizations such as Iran Human Rights. In the 28 days before Ghahremani's stay, more than 103 people were executed in Iran.

On 25 May, Iran's Supreme Court denied a request for retrial. Ghahremani was hanged on 4 November after the Supreme Court affirmed the death sentence. He was executed without prior notice to his family.

Ghahremani was the first Jewish person executed in Iran since 1994, when 77-year-old Feysollah Mechubad was put to death for "associating with Zionism," following earlier executions of Habib Elghanian in 1979 and Avraham Boruchim in 1980.

== Official Iranian narrative ==
The official account from Iranian state media and judicial authorities presents a different perspective on Arvin Ghahremani's case, challenging the sympathetic portrayal of him as a victim acting solely in self-defense.

According to statements from Kermanshah Prosecutor Hamid Reza Karimi, Ghahremani was convicted of "premeditated murder" under Iran's Islamic Penal Code for the 2022 stabbing death of Amir Shokri outside a gym in Kermanshah, following a dispute over a loaned sum of money. “The accused waited outside the sports club where the victim was training, armed with a knife,” Karimi claimed. “When the victim exited the facility, he launched an attack, inflicting multiple wounds to the victim’s back, head, neck and chest,” he added.

The judiciary reported that Ghahremani had "confessed to the crime" after stabbing Shokri "five times, including in his back and neck," which was interpreted as evidence of an aggressive act rather than a defensive response.

Regarding the blood money (diya) negotiations, Shokri's family repeatedly refused to consent to a settlement after failed discussions with Ghahremani's lawyers and relatives, exercising their legal right under qisas. No evidence was presented for the claim that they consented, and then withdrew that consent, after external pressure or anti-Semitic bias.

Some reports from within Iran's Jewish community, as cited by Voice of America, suggested the case was treated as a typical murder case rather than one influenced by Ghahremani's religious identity, with one Jewish Iranian stating, "It was about Ghahremani killing someone, not about him being Jewish."

== Reactions ==
American Ambassador Deborah Lipstadt condemned the execution on 6 November.

Human rights activists argued that the case constituted an example of the discriminatory nature of Iran's execution laws, which mandate capital punishment for the killing of a Muslim by a non-Muslim, but typically demand only financial compensation for the killing of a non-Muslim by a Muslim.

Analysts and members of the Jewish community of Iran linked the timing of Ghahremani's execution to the October 2024 Israeli strikes on Iran, suggesting that Iran refused to grant clemency to a Jewish man during this period of political tension.

Iran Human Rights Director Mahmood Amiry-Moghaddam criticized the execution, stating that the case had "significant flaws." He stated, "In the midst of the threats of war with Israel, the Islamic Republic executed Arvin Ghahremani, an Iranian Jewish citizen." He added, "However, in addition to this, Arvin was a Jew, and the institutionalized anti-Semitism in the Islamic Republic undoubtedly played a crucial role in the execution of his sentence."

Israel condemned Ghahremani's execution, with its Foreign Ministry’s Persian-language X account posting his photo alongside a statement calling the Islamic Republic regime "a criminal and bloodthirsty sect."

Iran's Jewish leaders responded with more restrained messages. Homayoon Sameh Yeh Najafabadi, the Jewish community's representative in parliament, shared a condolence letter via Telegram, while Chief Rabbi Yehuda Gerami posted a photo of Ghahremani in prison alongside the customary Hebrew phrase, "Blessed is the true judge."

== See also ==
- Habib Elghanian, Iranian Jew executed shortly after the Iranian Revolution in 1979
- Capital punishment in Iran
- History of the Jews in Iran
- Reyhaneh Jabbari
- Atefeh Sahaaleh
