= Zahau =

Zahau may refer to:

- Zahab-e Olya, village in Nehbandan County, South Khorasan Province, Iran
- Cheery Zahau (born 1981), Burmese human rights activist
- Rebecca Zahau (1979–2011), Burmese-American woman
