= 30 Years After =

30 Years After was founded in 2007 by Sam Yebri as a nonprofit, non-partisan organization for the Iranian-American Jewish community. The missions of the organization are education and political and community involvement.

Among other activities, the organization hosts a civic action conference, runs a mentorship program for Iranian-Jewish high school students, a voter registration drive, and quarterly educational and civic events.

== Events ==
In February 2008, 30 Years After hosted a "Super Tuesday" election night mixer to increase community interest and participation in the 2008 presidential election. The organization provided voter registration forms, informational pamphlets, and basic knowledge on key subjects. In attendance were several prominent public figures in the community, such as California State Assembly member Michael Feuer; Department of Water and Power General Manager David Nahai; and Sam Kermanian, secretary general of the Iranian American Jewish Federation.

On June 25, 2008, 30 Years After hosted a cocktail mixer for elected officials and members of the Iranian Jewish community at a private residence in Beverly Hills. Nearly 400 attendees met and conversed with leading political figures and heard rousing speeches by, among others, Beverly Hills City Councilmember Jimmy Delshad and Los Angeles County Sheriff Leroy Baca. The tremendous turnout at this event provided 30 Years After with significant momentum going into the organization's Civic Action Conference in September 2008.

On August 6, 2008, 30 Years After hosted a Presidential Election Forum to educate members of the Iranian American Jewish community with regard to the positions of Senator Barack Obama (D-IL) and Senator John McCain (R-AZ). Speaking on behalf of Senator Obama were Congressman Howard Berman (D-CA) and Retired Federal Judge Bruce Einhorn. Speaking on behalf of Senator McCain were Larry Greenfield of the Republican Jewish Coalition and Frank Nikbakht.

== Civic Action Conference ==
On September 14, 2008, 30 Years After hosted its 2008 Civic and Political Action Conference at the Beverly Hilton Hotel in Beverly Hills, California. The conference was attended by approximately 1,000 people and featured several prominent speakers, including nationally syndicated radio talk-show host Dennis Prager, Rabbi Marvin Hier of the Simon Wiesenthal Center, Congressman Henry Waxman (D-CA), Congressman Adam Schiff (D-CA) and California State Assemblyman Joel Anderson (R-El Cajon). Press coverage for the conference was picked up by The Jewish Journal of Greater Los Angeles and by The Washington Post.
