= Exodus of Iranian Jews =

20th-century population movement event

Exodus of Iranian Jews refers to the immigration of Iranian Jews from Iran in the 1950s and the later wave of emigration from the country during and after the Iranian Revolution of 1979, during which the Jewish community of 80,000 dropped to less than 20,000. The migration of Persian Jews after the Iranian Revolution is mostly attributed to fear of religious persecution, economic hardships, and insecurity after the deposition of the Imperial government.

The Iranian constitution nominally respects the rights of non-Muslim minorities; however, the strong Anti-Zionism policy of the Islamic Republic created fears among Iranian Jewry.

Many of the formerly 80,000-strong Iranian Jewish community had left Iran by 1978. Subsequently, more than 80% of the remaining Iranian Jews fled or emigrated from the country between 1979 and 2006. As of early 2013, a small Jewish community of an estimated 10,000 still resided in Iran as a protected minority.

== Background ==
After the destruction of the first Temple in 586 BCE, thousands of Jews were forced into exile and began to immigrate to different parts of the world. Some Jews found their new home in Iran and began a flourishing Jewish community there. The Iranian Jewish community solidified the Jewish presence in the Middle East. In the year 642 CE, Islamic rule was established in Iran and religious minorities, including Jews, became second class citizens. Some Iranian Jews began to migrate to other parts of the world to escape the growing Jewish resentment in Iran. In the 16th and 17th century, Shiite Islam became the religion of Iran and tensions between the Shiite Muslims and Iranian religious minorities escalated. Iranian Jews became the subject of forced conversions to Islam and many social restrictions. During the years between 1892 and 1910, some pogroms against Jews took place in Shiraz and other towns, culminating in the 1910 Shiraz blood libel, which resulted in thirteen deaths, injury, robbery, vandalism and near-starvation for the 6,000 Jews of Shiraz.

Historian Ervand Abrahamian estimated that 50,000 Jews lived in Iran around 1900, with majority of them residing in Yazd, Shiraz, Tehran, Isfahan and Hamadan.

== Post-1948 to 1950s ==
In 1948, Iran's Jewish population was approximately 150,000 people, the largest Jewish population in the Middle East after Israel. Most of the Jewish population was centered around Tehran, Esfahan, and Shiraz. While many Jews in Iran lived peacefully after the establishment of the State of Israel in 1948, there was increased Jewish emigration from Iran, similar to what was witnessed in other countries in the Middle East. Anti-Jewish sentiment increased under Prime Minister Mohammed Mosaddegh, and continued until the 1953 Iranian coup d'état, in part because of the weakening of the central government and strengthening of the clergy in the political struggles between the shah and the prime minister.

There are conflicting estimates on the number of Jews who chose to leave Iran during those years. According to Trita Parsi, by 1951 only 8,000 of 100,000 Iranian Jews had emigrated to Israel. However, according to Eliz Sanasarian, during 1948–1953, about one-third of Iranian Jews, most of them poor, emigrated to Israel.

== Stability in the 1950s, to instability in the late 1970s ==
After the deposition of Mossadegh in 1953, the reign of Shah Mohammad Reza Pahlavi was the most prosperous era for the Jews of Iran. Due to political instability in the 1970s and prompted by the Islamic Revolution, most Iranian Jews fled the country.

According to the first national census taken in 1956, Jewish population in Iran stood at 65,232, but there is no reliable data about migrations in the first half of the 20th century. David Littman puts the total figure of emigrants to Israel in 1948–1978 at 70,000.

== Main exodus late 1970s to 1990s ==
The tensions between the loyalists of the Shah and Islamists throughout the 1970s initiated the mass-migration of Iranian Jews, first affecting the higher-class. Instability caused thousands of Persian Jews to leave Iran prior to the revolution—some seeking better economic opportunities or stability, while others feared the potential Islamist takeover.

While many Jews in Iran lived peacefully after the establishment of the State of Israel, the Iranian Revolution "radically altered the status of the country's Jewish community". At the time of the 1979 Islamic Revolution, 60,000 Jews lived in Iran, of which about 30,000 Jews left within several months of the revolution, with many others following throughout the 1980s. According to the Jewish Telegraphic Agency, Jewish flight from Iran began in earnest after the May 1979 execution of Habib Elghanian, a philanthropist and leader in Iran's Jewish community, on false charges of spying for America and Israel.

Days after Elghanian's execution, a delegation of Iranian Jewish leaders met with Ayatollah Khomeini in Qom to seek assurances about the community's safety. During the meeting, Khomeini distinguished Iranian Jews from Zionism, saying, "We recognize our Jews as separate from those godless, bloodsucking Zionists," and issued a fatwa decreeing that Jews were to be protected. Nevertheless, emigration continued. The execution of Albert Danialpour on 5 June 1980 further encouraged emigration. According to activist Frank Nikbakht, Jews sought to escape the country's strict sharia laws, which were designed to humiliate and disadvantage the Jewish population.

After the initial wave of departures, exit routes became more irregular. In the early post-revolutionary period passport applicants were asked to state their religion and many who identified as Jewish had their passports confiscated, making legal departure temporarily impossible. Jews who could not obtain passports sometimes used smugglers to cross on foot into Turkey or Pakistan. Some left behind property and careers, while illegal crossings could result in arrest. By the 1980s, Pakistan had become an important route: in 1987, Austrian foreign minister Alois Mock said that 5,100 Iranian Jews had reached Austria via Pakistan since 1983. Later accounts describe organized crossings from Iran's Sistan and Baluchistan Province into Pakistan continuing until the late 1990s, including cases in which Iranian Jews disappeared or were killed while attempting to cross.

Some sources put the Iranian Jewish population in the mid- and late 1980s as between 50,000 and 60,000. An estimate based on the 1986 census put the figure for the same time period, at approximately 55,000. For the 1990s there has been more uniformity in the figures, with most sources since then estimating roughly 25,000 Jews remaining in Iran. Many Iranian Jews chose to immigrate to the United States and have built large communities in Los Angeles, Miami, Texas, and New York. According to the 2010 Foreign Born Population Survey, an estimated 100,000 Iranian Jews are currently living in Los Angeles. These new Iranian Jewish communities in the United States have thrived and have become great centers of Jewish learning and study for all Jews. These communities have kept many of their traditions alive through the teaching of Sephardic Jewish customs in schools and synagogues across the country. Iranian Jews living in the United States have also helped to bring other Jews from Iran and other parts of the world into the United States so they can escape religious persecution and harassment as well.

The migration of Persian Jews after the Iranian Revolution has generally been attributed to fear of religious persecution, economic hardships and insecurity after the deposition of the Shah regime and consequent domestic political violence and the Iran–Iraq War.

== Aftermath ==
Jews have their minority rights protected in Iran, though there is official discrimination. In order to prevent circumvention of emigration restrictions, the Iranian government prevents Jewish families from traveling abroad contemporaneously.

The United States State Department estimated the number of Jews in Iran at 20,000–25,000 as of 2009. The 2012 census put the figure of remaining Jewish community in Iran at about 9,000. The Jewish population of Iran was 8,756 according to 2013 Iranian census. According to Iranian census, the remaining Jewish population of Iran was 9,826 in 2016; while in 2021, the World Population Review website numbered the Jews in Iran at 8,500.

The Persian Jewish community has further attempted to help by sponsoring or raising funds to help other Jews emigrate to the United States. Jewish leaders in the early twentieth century were focused on bringing working and healthy Jews out of Europe and into the United States. Then their philosophy changed, in response to the dire political circumstances in Europe, as they started to help Jews of all ages and health conditions to come to America and assist them to settle down and assimilate into American life whilst keeping their core principles and faith.

== See also ==
- History of the Jews in Iran
- Persian Jews
- History of the Jews under Muslim rule
- Jewish exodus from the Muslim world
- Iran–Israel relations
