= Aziz Daneshrad =

Iranian politician (1920–1991)

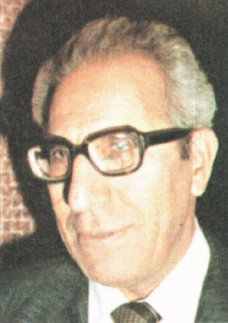

Member of the Assembly for the Final Review of the Constitution
- In office 18 August 1979 – 15 November 1979
- Constituency: Jewish community
- Majority: 8,927 (99.4%)

Personal details
- Born: Aziz Daneshrad-Kiyai; 1920 Golpayegan, Iran
- Died: 1991 (aged 70–71)
- Party: Tudeh Party of Iran
- Education: University of Tehran
- Occupation: Engineer

Aziz Daneshrad (Persian: عزیز دانش‌راد; 1920–1991) also known as Gabay (Persian: گبای) and Kiyai (Persian: کیائی) was an Iranian Jewish political activist who represented Jews in the Assembly for the Final Review of the Constitution. His was a proponent of left-wing politics while also advocating ethnoreligious identity.

== Early life and education ==
Aziz Daneshrad-Kiyai was born in 1920 in Golpayegan, Isfahan Province. His father was a rabbi and a merchant in bazaar. He obtained a bachelor's degree in electrical engineering from the University of Tehran and then became a civil servant.

== Political career ==
During the rule of Pahlavi dynasty, Daneshrad was a dissident associated with the Tudeh Party of Iran and he was imprisoned in the 1960s and the 1970s.

He co-founded the Association of Jewish Iranian Intellectuals (Jame‘eh-ye rowshanfekran-e kalimi-ye Iran; abbreviated AJII) in 1978, a revolutionary organization that tried to challenge the old guard leadership of the Jewish community which had royalist and Zionist orientations.

After the Iranian Revolution, he took charge as the interim chairman of the Tehran Jewish Association because the previous officeholder Habib Elghanian was executed. Daneshrad was elected to the Assembly for the Final Review of the Constitution shortly after. There he was one of the four members who represented religious minorities and he is likely to have sided with opposition to inclusion of the Guardianship of the Islamic Jurists in the constitution.

== Personal life ==
Daneshrad married Aghdas Kiaee in 1944. The couple had three sons and two daughters.

== Accolades ==
=== National ===
- Prime Medal of His Royal Highness
- Order of the Crown (Second Class)

Religious titles
Preceded by Habib Elghanian	Acting Chairman of the Tehran Jewish Association; 1979	Succeeded by Mousa Azadegan
