= Sasson Khakshouri =

Iranian Jewish businessman and tennis promoter

- Born: 23 November 1942; Tabriz, Iran
- Known for: Tennis promoter
- Spouse: Gollar Khakshouri (m. 1964)
- Children: Isaac Khakshouri; Nani Khakshouri-Brunner; Allon Khakshouri
- Parent(s): Aziz Khakshouri; Nanne Khakshouri
- Website: www.goldinthedust.com

Sasson Khakshouri (born November 23, 1942, in Tabriz, Iran) is an Iranian Jewish businessman and tennis promoter, best known for founding the Kremlin Cup.

== Early life and family ==
Sasson Khakshouri was born in Tabriz, Iran, third child and first son out of eight children of Aziz and Nanne Khakshouri. The family belonged to the small Jewish community in Tabriz, which was in turn part of the larger Nash Didan community centered in Urmia. Sasson grew up in Tabriz, Rezaiyeh and Tehran. After his parents and younger siblings immigrated to Israel, he stayed to run and liquidate the family business. In 1964 Sasson married his second cousin Gollar, daughter of the renowned businessman Youssef Khakshouri, and moved to Hamburg. The couple has three children - Isaac, Nani and Allon. They have lived in Hamburg, Zurich and New York, before settling in Israel in 1996. During his years in Europe, Sasson Khakshouri has served in different roles in Jewish organizations such as Maccabi. and Keren HaYesod.

== Eastern Bloc Business ==
The Khakshouri family had business with Russia already in Iran. Upon his immigration to Hamburg, Sasson joined his father in law's business, and took on the trade with the Eastern Bloc, mostly carpet trade with Russia. Between 1964 and 1989, he travelled across the Iron Curtain more than 300 times. His business with the Eastern Bloc continued well after the dissolution of the Soviet Union, and included Turkmenistan, Dagestan, Azerbaijan, Armenia, Georgia and more. Upon the advice of his wife Gollar, he continued to conduct business with the Eastern Bloc also as part of his tennis promotion activity.

== Tennis Promotion ==
Khakshouri has always been keen on sports, playing basketball, organizing swimming classes and for a while heading Maccabi Germany. He became a tennis fan in the late 1970s, and due to his frequent business trips to Moscow, became especially interested in Russian tennis player Andrei Chesnokov.

=== Kremlin Cup ===
Establishing a world-class tennis tournament in Russia was an idea he vigorously promoted for four years without any prior knowledge or experience, and his efforts succeeded after meeting former Russian Tennis Federation member Boris Fomenko, who introduced him to many helpful figures in Russia, among them Alexander Vainshtein, Yegor Yakovlev, Shamil Tarpishchev, President Boris Yeltsin, and Prime Minister Ivan Silaev, who became tournament chairman and facilitated visa issues. Recruiting Gene Scott as tournament director was the winning shot. The tournament received an ATP Tour license, and the first Kremlin Cup took place in November 1990. Prime Minister Silaev said Sasson Khakshouri has "brought the sun in these dark times in our country" The Khakshouri family held the Kremlin Cup ATP Tour license until 1997.

=== Uzbekistan President's Cup and promoting tennis in Uzbekistan ===
Through Alexander Silaev, Ivan Silaev's son, Khakshouri was introduced to the Uzbek businessman Sanjar Kassimov, and through him to the Islam Karimov, the leader of Uzbekistan. Karimov asked Sasson to organize a similar tennis tournament in Uzbekistan, in order to "put it on the map". The first President's Cup took place in 1994 on clay surface, as an ATP Challenger, as conditions in Uzbekistan did not suffice for an ATP Tour license. This tournament, as well as men's challengers, satellite circuits, and Futures tournaments developed by Khakshouri and his team from the Israel Tennis Centers throughout the country, promoted not only tennis in Uzbekistan but also tourism, encouraged the state to upgrade flights, hotels and facilities, and in 1997 the President Cup was upgraded to ATP Tour. After the 2002 tournament, having achieved the goal of putting Uzbekistan on the map, the President's Cup was discontinued, and instead the Tashkent Open was established, without Khakshouri's involvement.
