= Henry Elghanayan =

American real estate developer

- Born: Houchang Elghanayan; August 2, 1940 (age 86); Tehran, Imperial State of Iran
- Education: Hamilton College (BA); Columbia University (MBA); New York University (JD)
- Occupation: Real estate developer
- Known for: Co-founder and chairman of the Rockrose Development Corporation
- Spouse: Nancy Elghanayan
- Children: 3
- Family: Habib Elghanian (uncle)

Henry Elghanayan (Persian: هنری القانیان; born August 2, 1940, in Tehran) is an Iranian-born American real estate developer who co-founded and is the current chairman the Rockrose Development Corporation.

== Early life and education ==
Henry Elghanayan was born Houchang Elghanayan on August 2, 1940 to a Persian-Jewish family in Iran. Elghanayan's father, Nourallah, belonged to a prominent manufacturing family in Iran during the reign of Mohammad Reza Shah and was also involved in the import-export business. His uncle, Habib Elghanian, was executed in 1979. In 1945, his father moved the family to Forest Hills, Queens, where he made investments in real estate.

Henry has three brothers: Kamran Thomas (born 1945), Frederick (born 1949), and Jeffrey (born 1955); and one sister, Lili (born 1944). Henry graduated with a B.A. from Hamilton College, an M.B.A. from Columbia Business School, and a J.D. from New York University Law School. While in law school, he worked as a rental real estate agent.

== Career ==
In 1970, with $100,000 in seed money from their father, the three eldest brothers renovated a six-apartment walk-up apartment building in Greenwich Village but nearly lost their investment when the market collapsed. Once the market recovered, they refinanced and invested in ever larger buildings on the Upper West Side and in Brooklyn Heights including the 337 unit Turtle Bay Towers; the historic 479 unit Archive in the West Village, which they converted into lofts; the Cast Iron Building; and the Carnegie Hall Tower. The brothers divided their responsibilities with lawyer Henry responsible for financing; engineer Fred responsible for construction; and Yale and Harvard business school graduate Tom responsible for development and acquisitions. His youngest brother, Jeffrey, would later join the firm as an architect. They took a conservative approach to financing, never borrowing more than 75% of the buildings cost (as compared to the more typical 95%).

In the 1990s, they expanded throughout New York City, converting office buildings into apartments in the Financial district and pioneering developments on the Queens waterfront in Long Island City and West Side of Manhattan. They diversified their portfolio into metropolitan Washington D.C. after the September 11 attacks.

In August 2008, Henry initiated the dissolving of the partnership. His brothers disagreed with his desire to move the firm more into development rather than renovation and leasing as well as to take on outside partners. They also balked at naming Henry's son, Justin, as successor to the business. They divided the assets into three portfolios and drew straws to determine who would own which portfolio. Henry won the firm's development projects, the right to the Rockrose name, and eight residential buildings with 2,634 apartments. Tom and Fred received the remainder consisting of 5,000 apartments in 13 buildings, the office building portfolio, and their properties in Long Island City and continued on as partners with their new firm TF Cornerstone. The day before they divided their assets, their mother died; the day after, their father died.

Under Henry's management, Rockrose has acquired over $600 million in additional properties in New York City and Washington, D.C., and developed the $300 million apartment building, Linc LIC, in Court Square in Long Island City.

== Personal life ==
In 1965, Elghanayan married Nancy, to whom he rented an apartment while he was in law school. They have three children. Elghanayan is an art collector and philanthropist.
