= Hakim Yazghel Haqnazar =

Iranian physician

Ḥakīm Yazghel Ḥaqnaẓͅar was an Iranian Jewish court physician of Mohammad Shah Qajar (r. 1834–1848) and Naser al-Din Shah Qajar (r. 1848–1896). He was on good terms with Naser al-Din Shah's mother Malek Jahan Khanom, and with Jeyran, one of Naser al-Din Shah's beloved wives and first mistress. Haqnazar's grandfather had come to the capital Tehran from Khansar (northwest of Isfahan) in 1821 during the reign of Fath-Ali Shah Qajar (r. 1797–1834). Haqnazar is credited with having founded the Hakim synagogue in the Jewish quarter of Tehran. His three brothers were also court physicians; his brother Hakim Musa (died 1881), also served under Mohammad Shah and Naser al-Din Shah.
