= Hanina Mizrahi =

Iranian Jewish teacher, educator, and folklorist

- חנינא מזרחי
- Born: 1886; Tehran, Iran
- Died: 1974 (aged 87–88); Jerusalem, Israel
- Occupations: Teacher, educator, author
- Known for: Writing about the folklore and customs of the Jews of Iran
- Parent: Rabbi Hayyim Eleazar Mizrahi

Hanina Mizrahi (Hebrew: חנינא מזרחי; 1886–1974) was an Iranian Jewish teacher, educator and public figure, who became known as the first author who wrote works about the folklore and customs of the Jews of Iran. Born in the capital Tehran in 1886, he was the son of Rabbi Hayyim Eleazar Mizrahi, the spiritual leader of the cities' Jewish community. Mizrahi and his family moved to Ottoman-held Palestine in 1895. He died in Jerusalem in 1974.
