= Soleyman Binafard =

Iranian wrestler

Personal information
- Born: 1933; Iran
- Updated on 28 May 2007

Soleyman Binafard (Persian: سلیمان بینافرد; born 1933) is a former Iranian sport wrestler who is the only Jew in Iran to join its national wrestling team.

He started to wrestle freestyle in 1950 at the age of 15. That year, he won the championship in Tehran's Junior League.

He was twice freestyle national champion in the 48 kg weight class, winner of Tehran's Taj Arena Championship, champion (single & double champion) in Tehran's senior league, second in Greco-Roman Olympic trials in Italy (1960), second in World Team Trials championship, and a silver medalist in the Maccabiah.
