= Jojo Anavim =

American contemporary visual artist (born 1985)

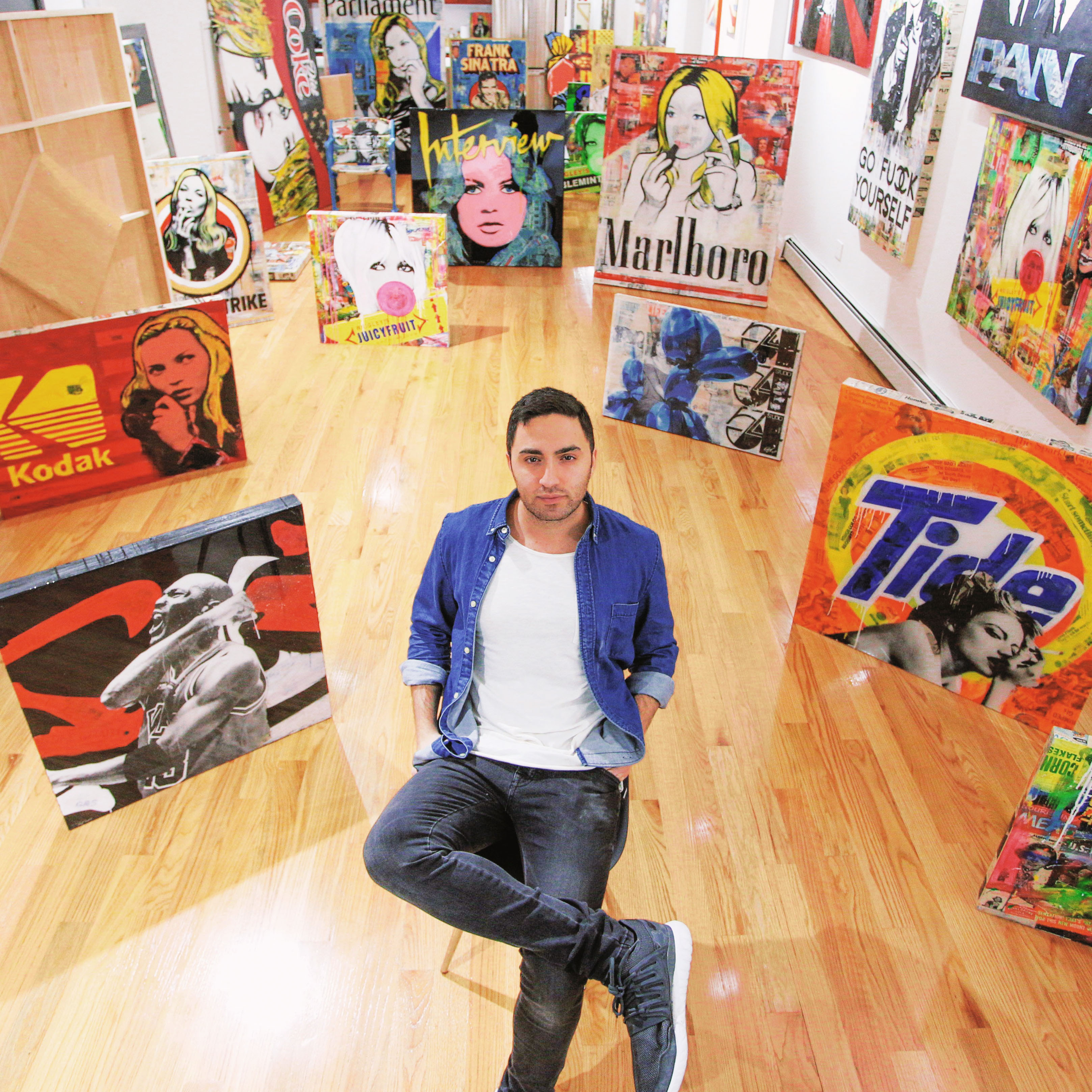
- Jojo Anavim in his New York City studio, 2016.
- Born: 1985 (age 40–41)
- Known for: Painting, Collage
- Notable work: Don't Post That
- Movement: Contemporary Art
- Website: www.jojoanavim.com

Jojo Anavim is an American contemporary visual artist. Anavim's work features a blend of pop art and street-art influences and employs a large variety of materials and techniques including collage and acrylic paints.

== Background ==
He was born to Persian-Jewish parents who emigrated from Iran prior to the Islamic Revolution in 1979. Anavim's mother, a marketing manager, and his father, a jeweler, encouraged his interest in the arts. They enrolled him in art classes taught by Al Baruch, the Disney animator who created Captain Hook and Mighty Mouse. As a child, Anavim was naturally drawn to design; namely the typography, juxtaposition and colorful artwork of commercial packaging.

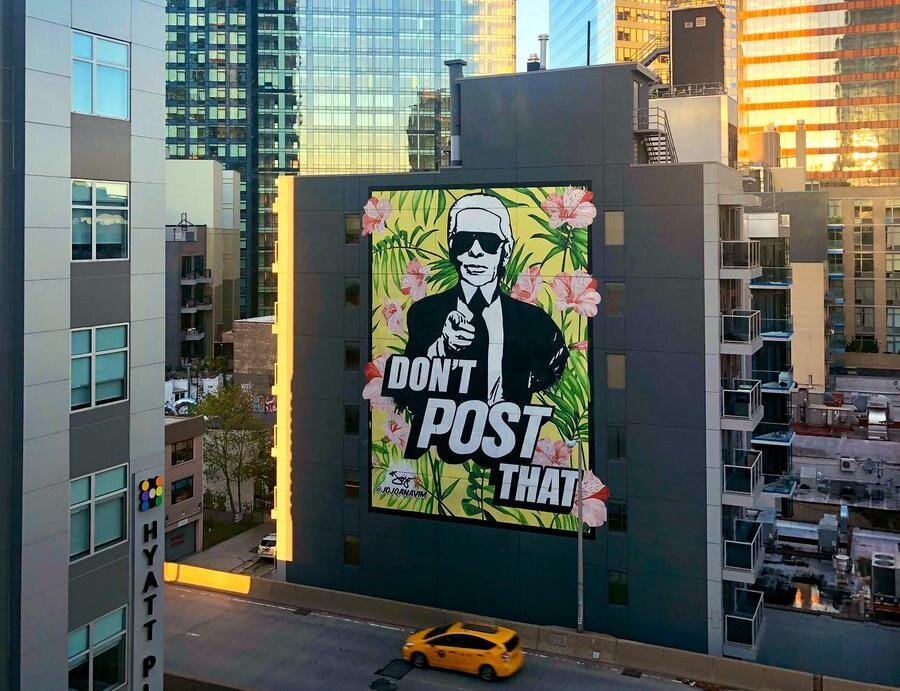
'Don't Post That' mural for Canvas Condo Apartments, Long Island City.

== Career ==
After studying Business at Hofstra University for one year, Anavim transferred to Hunter College. Afterwards, he worked as a contract graphic designer. Anavim enjoyed success as a graphic designer; creating print and digital ad campaigns for businesses such as W Hotels and Sephora, and album art for artists with Universal Music Group, such as The Chainsmokers.

In 2013, Anavim transitioned to creating fine art full-time. In 2018, Anavim was featured in a New York Knicks Exclusive interview highlighting the unique process and artistry of his paintings. He has also been commissioned to create original pieces by celebrities such as Seth MacFarlane, Selena Gomez, Sheldon Adelson, Paris Hilton, Daymond John, and Big Sean. His work can be found in the Coca-Cola Archives Museum in Atlanta, GA; Madison Square Garden, New York, NY; and New York Yankees City Seats Collection in New York, NY.

== Style ==
Anavim has said “I try to draw out those warm, fuzzy emotions of happiness in people — and when I do, I have done my job.” His work can include over 100 layers of collage, acrylic and aerosol paints, oil pastels, diamond dust, silk-screen, gel transfers and more. In his original piece for Amar’e Stoudemire, Anavim tracked down copies of The New York Times article from 1948 announcing the independence of the State of Israel, incorporating the historic moment in his collage.
