= David Peyman =

American government official

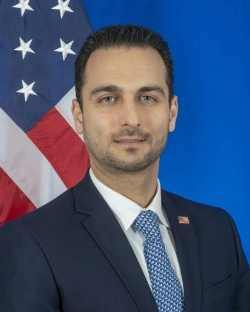

Deputy Special Envoy to Combat Antisemitism for BDS, Eurasia & Special Projects

Deputy Assistant Secretary of State for Counter Threat Finance and Sanctions
- In office August 1, 2018 – April 5, 2020

Personal details
- Education: UCLA (B.A.); Harvard Law School (J.D.)

David Peyman is an American attorney. He served as Deputy Special Envoy to Combat Antisemitism for BDS, Eurasia & Special Projects in the United States Department of State, and from August 1, 2018 to April 5, 2020 he was the Deputy Assistant Secretary of State for Counter Threat Finance and Sanctions in the Bureau of Economic and Business Affairs. In this role, Peyman led the Office of Economic Sanctions Policy and Implementation and the Office of Threat Finance Countermeasures. Peyman served as Of Counsel to the law firm DLA Piper and now leads David Peyman Global Strategies to advise public sector and private sector clients on sanctions, AML, and FCPA compliance, digital currency and blockchain technologies, maritime compliance, and securing critical mineral and metals supply chains.

== Education ==
Peyman earned his B.A. from UCLA, where he graduated summa cum laude, received the Chancellor's Service Award, and was his class's commencement speaker. Peyman then earned a J.D. from Harvard Law School.

== Career ==
Peyman began his law career at Skadden. He subsequently served as a Special Assistant United States Attorney and Deputy Attorney General of California. During his service as a state prosecutor, Peyman was also an adjunct law professor at Southwestern Law School, where he taught a course on government investigations and prosecutions. In the private sector, Peyman worked at BlackRock, where he was Global Head of Sanctions and led the sanctions compliance framework for over $6 trillion in assets under management.

From August 1, 2018 to April 5, 2020, Peyman served as the Deputy Assistant Secretary of State for Counter Threat Finance and Sanctions in the Bureau of Economic and Business Affairs of the U.S. State Department. In this role, Peyman led the Office of Economic Sanctions Policy and Implementation and the Office of Threat Finance Countermeasures. He was the leader for managing 25 sanctions programs for the Secretary of State, including those on Iran, North Korea, and Venezuela.

Peyman devised and created the historic first ever economic sanctions targeting team at the State Department within his division.

In his efforts to enforce sanctions against Iran, Peyman monitored ship-to-ship transfers of Iranian oil, secured pledges from countries to not flag Iranian oil tankers, and threatened to take action against any company using the European financial mechanism INSTEX to engage in sanctionable transactions with Iran. He met with shipping officials in Europe and said ships were "the key artery to evade sanctions." Peyman oversaw the imposition of sanctions on Chinese shipping giant COSCO for transporting Iranian oil, which "sent worldwide freight costs to record highs and disrupted the global shipping market."

In a November 2019 meeting with the International Chamber of Shipping, Peyman informed the group that the U.S. would be focusing on sanctions enforcement against Iran in the maritime sector. In a March 9, 2020 address at the Foundation for Defense of Democracies, Peyman announced the U.S. would soon issue a global maritime sanctions advisory aimed at enhancing sanctions compliance against Iran in the maritime sector, including flagging registries, insurance companies, ship owners, port operators, managers, and charter companies. On May 14, 2020, the Trump administration officially issued the "Global Maritime Advisory" concerning sanctions on Iran, North Korea, and Syria.

In leading the State Department's Office of Threat Finance Countermeasures, Peyman helped combat terrorist financing and the illicit use of precious minerals and metals and coordinated US government interagency implementation of the Kimberly Process. Peyman also oversaw the State Department’s international engagement on anti-money laundering and counter terrorist financing (AML/CFT) issues, and his Division represented the State Department in the Financial Action Task Force.
