= Peyghambarieh =

Iranian national heritage site

Peighambarieh/Chahar-Anbiya
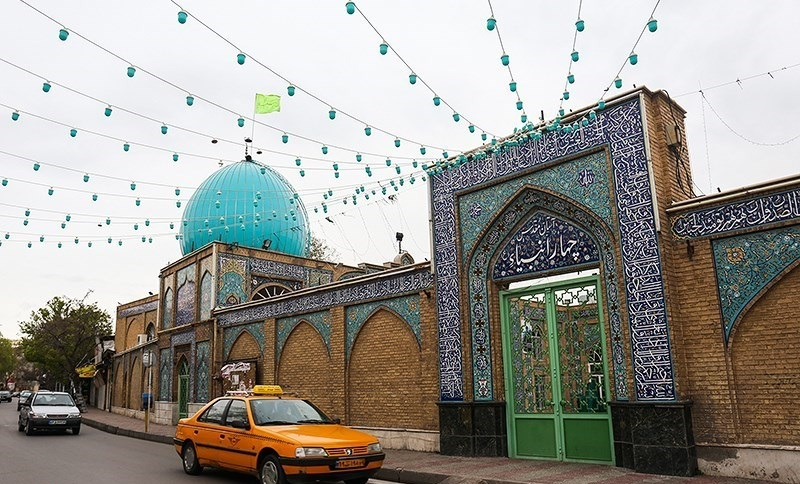

- Location within Iran

Religion
- Affiliation: Shi'a
- Province: Qazvin province

Location
- Location: Qazvin, Iran
- Interactive map of Peighambarieh/Chahar-Anbiya
- Coordinates: 36.2689°N 50.0029°E

Architecture
- Type: mosque, madrasah and mausoleum/shrine
- Style: Safavid style
- Completed: 1913–1914
- Dome: 1

Website
- http://www.4anbia.ir/index.html

Peighambarieh (Persian: پیغمبریه) also known as Chahar-Anbiya is a Shi'ite religious complex located in the city of Qazvin in Iran. The mosque dates back to the Safavid era, but an inscription within it states that the mosque was completed in 1913–1914. The mosque's main name is derived from the word 'Peighambar' which means 'Prophet' in Persian, and appropriately, it is said that four Israelite prophets are buried in the shrine within the structure, hence the second name of the mosque is 'Chahar-Anbiya' which means 'Four Prophets' in Persian as well. The complex of Peighambarieh is located to the west of the Chehel Sotun royal pavilion.

== History ==
Peighambarieh was said to have been constructed during the Safavid era. However, no record of it existed until the Qajar era. It was not recorded by Hamdallah Mustawfi in his book Nuzhat al-Qulub, which suggested that the building did not exist during the Ilkhanate. However, later research suggests that the place was a popular pilgrimage destination during the Safavid era. Inscriptions within the mosque, however, date the completion of construction to the years 1913–1914.

== Architecture ==
The shrine area is decorated in all four corners. There are four long arches on the four sides of the room, which are supported by firm bases. From the place where the arches begin, there is a calligraphic inscription of a verse from Surah Al-Jumu'ah written in gold color on a background made from Lapis Lazuli. This inscription was done by the late cleric Ali Sekkaki. A zarih stands around the cenotaphs over the alleged graves of the four saints.

== The Four Prophets ==
The names of the four prophets buried in this structure are Salam, Solum, Sohuli, and Al-Qiyah. Their names are also given as Saduq, Masduq and Shalum. Shi'ite traditions from Persia affirms them as people who foretold the coming of Jesus, and their origin is said to be from the Children of Israel. Other narrations cite them as being companions of Daniel, whose tomb is located in the same country at Susa. An erroneous narration also claims that three of the four prophets were the ones sent to the People of Ya-Sin.

== Imamzadeh Salih ==
In the religious complex, there is an Imamzadeh shrine-mausoleum dedicated to Salih ibn al-Hasan. He is said to have been the son of Hasan ibn Ali, the grandson of the Islamic prophet Muhammad.

== See also ==
- List of mosques in Iran
