= Janet Cohansedgh =

Iranian athlete

Personal information
- Full name: Janet Cohansedgh
- Born: 1945 Tehran, Iran
- Died: June 1972 (aged 26–27) Tehran, Iran
- Years active: 1961–1972

Janet Cohansedgh (Persian: جنت کهن صدق, 1945–1972) was an Iranian athlete who died at the height of her career. She was a national champion and holder of a number of records in the early and mid-1960s.

== Biography ==
Born in 1945, she was the third daughter of the Cohansedgh family. Her first 100-meter race was in 1960 where she came in a respectable third place. As an adult, her first race was in 1960 when she won the 80-meters in a record time of 11 seconds.

A graduate of the Anushiravan High School, she received a degree in physical education from the University of Tehran. Her crowning achievement was at a track and field meet in October 1965. There, Cohansedgh broke the 100 meter and 60-meter hurdle records. The 35,000 people in the stadium began to chant her name and she was named athlete of the year by sports weekly, Keyhan-e-varzeshi. In 1964, along with five other female athletes, Cohansedgh was among the first Iranian women to attend and compete in the Olympics in Tokyo, Japan. In addition to representing Iran in the Olympics, she was also invited to several international competitions including the Asian Games in Israel. In June 1972, she died in a car crash along with the captain of the Iran women's national basketball team, Simin Shafiqi. In her memory, both the University of Tehran and the Iranian Track and Field Federation instituted yearly competitions in her name. During the first one, she was honored in her own discipline by having lane 2 remain open and strewn with flowers, as that was the last place where she competed.

== See also ==
- List of Iranian women athletes
