= David Nahai =

American lawyer and activist (born 1959)

Hamid David Nahai (born 1959) is an Iranian-American environmental attorney, political activist, and former head of the Los Angeles Department of Water and Power.

== Early life and education ==
David Nahai was born into a Jewish family in 1959 in the Iranian capital, Tehran. In 1969 Nahai moved to the United Kingdom where he later attended the London School of Economics. After the 1979 Islamic Revolution, Nahai relocated to the United States where he received his JD from the University of California, Berkeley.

== Career and Los Angeles DWP ==
Nahai founded the Los Angeles based Nahai Law Corporation in 1992. The firm specializes in "real estate, corporate, environmental and commercial law." Nahai served several terms on the Regional Water Quality Control Board before being appointed to the DWP board of commissioners in 2005 by Los Angeles mayor Antonio Villaraigosa.

In December 2007, Villaraigosa elevated Nahai to "the post of DWP general manager and chief executive officer". Nahai's approximately two-year tenure was marked by a heightened emphasis on renewable energy sources and conservation. During his time at the DWP, the department increased its renewable energy portfolio to 14 percent and the city of Los Angeles saw its lowest monthly water use in 32 years (in June 2009).

In October 2009, Nahai resigned as general manager of the Los Angeles Department of Water and Power, citing his desire to devote his time and resources to the Clinton Climate Initiative that he had joined shortly before. The Clinton Climate Initiative is an organization founded by former US president Bill Clinton with the aim of fighting the causes of global climate change.

== Family ==
David Nahai is married to novelist and USC professor Gina Nahai. They have three children and currently reside in Los Angeles.
