= Zahab-e Olya =

Zahab-e Olya زهاب عليا
- Village
- Location within Iran
- Coordinates: 31°52′20″N 60°08′47″E
- Country: Iran
- Province: South Khorasan
- County: Nehbandan
- Bakhsh: Shusef
- Rural District: Shusef

Population (2006)
  - Total: 280
- Time zone: UTC+3:30 (IRST)
  - Summer (DST): UTC+4:30 (IRDT)

Zahab-e Olya (Persian: زهاب عليا, also Romanized as Z̄ahāb-e ‘Olyā; also known as Z̄ehāb, Zahau, Za Hauz, Zāhū, Zeh Āb, and Zū Ḥowz) is a village in Shusef Rural District, Shusef District, Nehbandan County, South Khorasan Province, Iran. At the 2006 census, its population was 280, in 68 families.
