= Habib Elghanian =

20th-century Iranian Jewish businessman

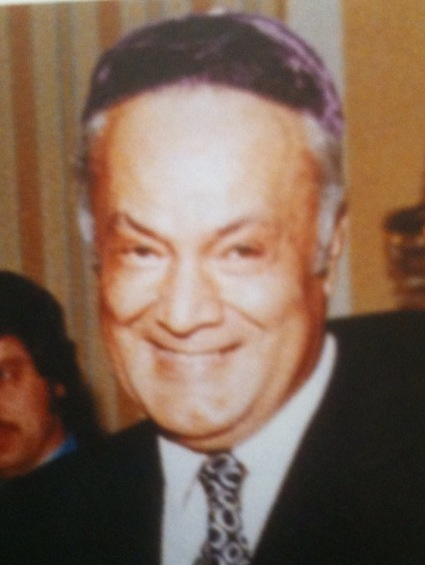
- Habib Elghanian
- Born: 5 April 1912; Tehran, Sublime State of Iran
- Died: 9 May 1979 (aged 67); Tehran, Iran
- Occupation: Businessman
- Known for: Owner of PlascoKar Com

Habib (Habibollah) Elghanian (Persian: حبیب (حبیب‌الله) القانیان; 5 April 1912 – 9 May 1979) was a prominent Iranian Jewish businessman and philanthropist who served as the president of the Tehran Jewish Society and acted as the symbolic head of the Iranian Jewish community in the 1970s. He was arrested and sentenced to death by an Islamic revolutionary tribunal shortly after the Iranian Revolution for charges including corruption, contacts with Israel and Zionism, and "friendship with the enemies of God", and was executed by firing squad on 9 May 1979 in Tehran, Iran. He was the first and last Jew and businessman to be executed by the Council of the Islamic Revolution.

== Early life and education ==
Elghanian was born in 1912 in Iran and had six brothers, Aghadjan, Davoud, Nourollah (father of Henry Elghanayan), Sion, Ataollah and Nedjatollah.

== Career ==
In 1959, Elghanian established Plasco, a plastics manufacturing factory in Tehran which later became the largest and most technologically advanced plastics manufacturer in Iran. He played a significant role in bringing Western technology to Iran in the 1960s and 1970s. A self-made multi-millionaire, Elghanian was known for his entrepreneurial accomplishments in Iran and Israel. In addition, he served as the leader of the Tehran Jewish Society in the 1960s and 1970s.

== Arrest and execution ==
Elghanian was arrested in 1975 as part of Mohammad Reza Shah's attempts to eliminate corruption among major businesspeople. He was both fined and jailed for illegal activities.

Shortly after the Islamic revolution in 1979, Elghanian was arrested on 16 March after returning to Iran, and accused of spying. The charges included corruption, contacts with Israel and Zionism, and "economic imperialism". On 8 May, he was tried and convicted of a number of crimes, including meeting with Israeli leaders. According to his granddaughter, the trial lasted less than twenty minutes. He was sentenced to death, with his execution carried out before dawn the next day. All of the property belonging to the Elghanian family in Iran was confiscated by the state. A report by Time magazine states:

Elghanian, who was convicted of spying for Israel, was said to have made huge investments in Israel and to have solicited funds for the Israeli army, which the prosecution claimed made him an accomplice "in murderous air raids against innocent Palestinians."

Elghanian stated that he was not a supporter of Zionism, though his Plasco Building was built by Israeli engineers during the Pahlavi era when Iran had close relations with Israel, and he had made investments in Israel.

On 9 May 1979, Elghanian was executed by firing squad in Tehran. He was the first and only Jewish citizen and one of the first Iranian civilians to be executed by the new Islamist regime.

== Consequences ==
Elghanian's death was considered one of the reasons for the departure of 75% of the 80,000 Jews who lived in the country before the revolution.

Amid the post-revolution chaos, the government with its many rival factions initially refused to release Elghanian's body to his family for burial. With the intervention of Chief Rabbi Yedidia Shofet and other prominent members of the Tehran Jewish community, his body was finally released and initially buried in an unmarked grave in Tehran's Beheshtieh Jewish Cemetery. Out of fear of further retaliation, only a handful of people attended Elghanian's burial. A modest tombstone was later placed on his grave making no reference to his execution.

Shortly after Elghanian's execution, the United States Senate passed a resolution authored by New York Senator Jacob Javits to condemn his execution as well as that of other civilians as a violation of human rights in Iran.

In the aftermath of the Stuxnet worm that attacked Iran's nuclear facilities, there was speculation by security researchers working for Symantec that a number found in the Stuxnet code – "19790509" – which was used as a marker to identify computers that should not be affected, was a reference to his execution date; however, researchers also warned against using this possible connection to draw any conclusions as to Stuxnet's origin.
