= History of the Jews in Iran =

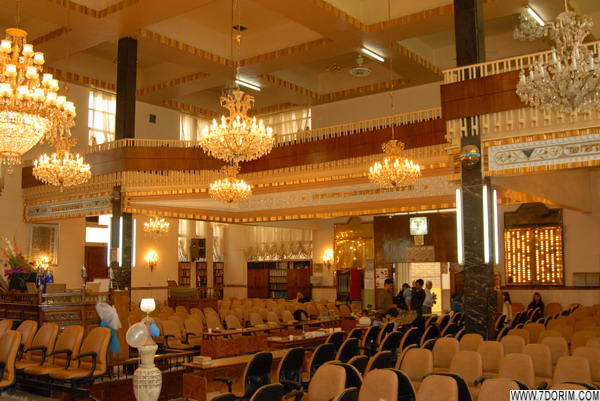
Interior of Yusef Abad Synagogue, the main synagogue in Iran's capital Tehran, 2005.

The history of the Jews in Iran dates back to late biblical times (mid-1st millennium BCE). The biblical books of Chronicles, Isaiah, Daniel, Ezra, Nehemiah, contain references to the life and experiences of Jews in Persia. In the book of Ezra, the Persian kings are credited with permitting and enabling the Jews to return to Jerusalem and rebuild their Temple; its reconstruction was carried out "according to the decree of Cyrus, and Darius, and Artaxerxes king of Persia" (Ezra 6:14). This event in Jewish history took place in the late 6th century BCE, by which time there was a well-established and influential Jewish community in Persia.

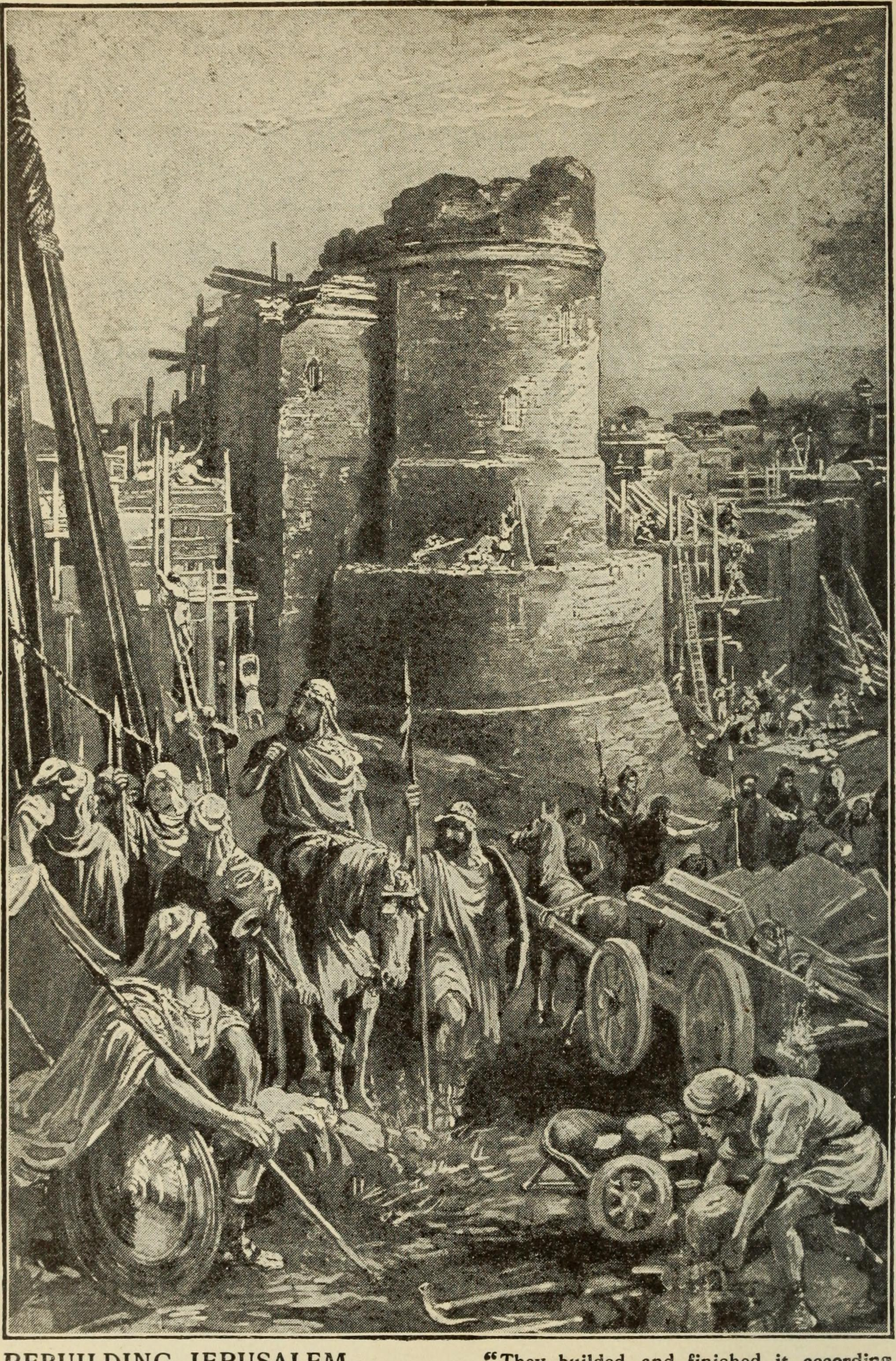
Jerusalem is rebuilt by Cyrus, Darius, and Artaxerxes. From "Our day in the light of the prophecy", 1921.

Persian Jews have lived in the territories of today's Iran for over 2,700 years, since the first Jewish diaspora when the Assyrian king Shalmaneser V conquered the (Northern) Kingdom of Israel (722 BCE) and took some of the Israelites into captivity at Khuzestan. In 586 BCE, the Neo-Babylonian Empire expelled large populations of Jews from Judea to the Babylonian captivity.

Jews who migrated to ancient Persia mostly lived in their own communities. The Persian Jewish communities include the ancient (and until the mid-20th century still-extant) communities not only of Iran, but also the Armenian, Georgian, Iraqi, Bukharan, and the Mountain Jewish communities. Some of the communities were isolated from other Jewish communities, to the extent that their classification as "Persian Jews" is a matter of linguistic or geographical convenience rather than actual historical relationship with one another.

Jews trace their heritage in Iran to the Babylonian captivity of the 6th century BCE and have retained their ethnic, linguistic, and religious identity. However, a Library of Congress country study on Iran states that "Over the centuries the Jews of Iran became physically, culturally, and linguistically indistinguishable from the non-Jewish population. The overwhelming majority of Jews speak Persian as their mother language, and a tiny minority, Kurdish." As of 2023, the Jewish population in Iran is 9,100. As of 2025, there are approximately 100 synagogues in Iran.

== Assyrian exile of Northern Kingdom ==
According to the Bible, the Kingdom of Israel (or Northern Kingdom) was one of the successor states to the older United Monarchy (also called the Kingdom of Israel), which came into existence in about the 930s BCE after the northern Tribes of Israel rejected Solomon's son Rehoboam as their king. In c. 732 BCE, the Assyrian king, Tiglath-Pileser III sacked Damascus and Israel, annexing Aramea and Transjordan territory of the tribes of Reuben, Gad and Manasseh in Gilead including the desert outposts of Jetur, Naphish and Nodab. Israel continued to exist within the reduced territory as an independent kingdom subject to Assyria until around 725-720 BCE, when Assyria again invaded it, and the rest of the population was deported. From this time, no trace exists of the Kingdom of Israel and its population are commonly referred as Ten Lost Tribes. The Bible (2 Kings 18:11) reports that some of these ten lost tribes were expelled to the land of the Medes in modern-day Iran. The book of Tobit, which is part of the biblical Apocrypha, suggests that there were people from the tribe of Naphtali living in Rhages (Rey, Iran) and Ecbatana (Hamedan) at the time of the Assyrians (Book of Tobit 6:12).

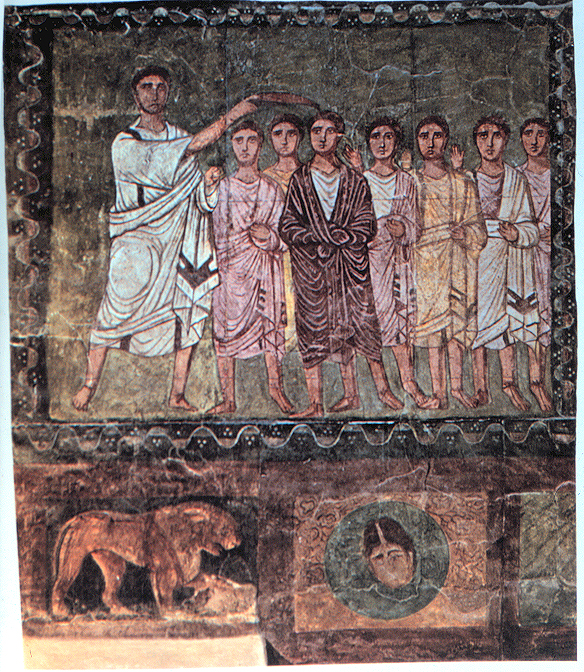
Samuel anointing David. Jewish messiah has to be anointed, and Cyrus is the only Gentile that has been referred to as Messiah in the Bible.

== Persian Jewry under Cyrus the Great ==
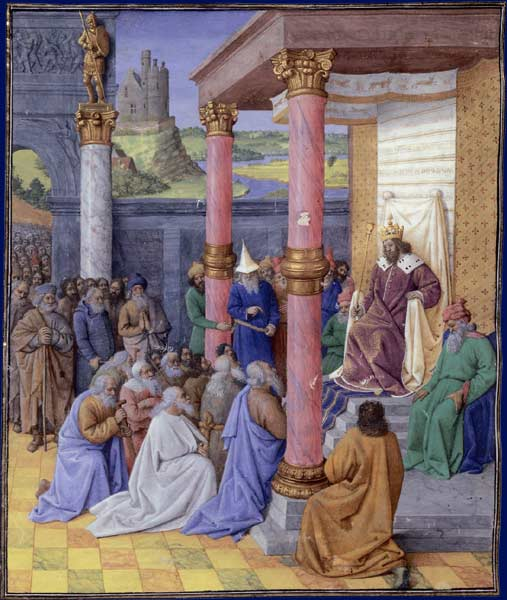
Cyrus the Great allowing Hebrew pilgrims to return to and rebuild Jerusalem

Three times during the 6th century BCE, the Jews (Hebrews) of the ancient Kingdom of Judah were exiled to Babylon by Nebuchadnezzar. These three separate occasions are mentioned in Jeremiah (52:28–30). The first exile was in the time of Jehoiachin in 597 BCE, when the Temple of Jerusalem was partially despoiled and a number of the leading citizens exiled. After eleven years (in the reign of Zedekiah) a new Judean uprising took place; the city was razed to the ground, and a further exile ensued. Finally, five years later, Jeremiah records a third exile. After the overthrow of Babylonia by the Achaemenid Empire, Cyrus the Great allowed the Jews to return to their native land (537 BCE). According to the Hebrew Bible (See Jehoiakim; Ezra; Nehemiah and Jews) more than forty thousand are said to have availed themselves of the privilege, however this is not supported by modern scholarship. Lester Grabbe argues that the immigration would probably only have amounted to a trickle over decades, with the archaeological record showing no evidence of large scale increases in population at any time during the Persian period. Cyrus also allowed them to practice their religion freely (See Cyrus Cylinder) unlike the previous Assyrian and Babylonian rulers.

In the first year of Cyrus king of Persia, to fulfill the word of the Lord spoken by Jeremiah, the Lord moved the heart of Cyrus king of Persia to make a proclamation throughout his realm and also to put it in writing: "This is what Cyrus king of Persia says: 'The Lord, the God of heaven, has given me all the kingdoms of the earth and he has appointed me to build a temple for him at Jerusalem in Judah. Any of his people among you may go up to Jerusalem in Judah and build the temple of the Lord, the God of Israel, the God who is in Jerusalem, and may their God be with them. And in any locality where survivors may now be living, the people are to provide them with silver and gold, with goods and livestock, and with freewill offerings for the temple of God in Jerusalem.'" —Book of Ezra, 1:1–4

== The Second Temple period ==
The Bible states that Cyrus ordered the rebuilding of the Second Temple in the same place as the first but died before it was completed. The historical nature of this has been challenged. Professor Lester L Grabbe argues that there was no decree but that there was a policy that allowed exiles to return to their homelands and rebuild their temples. He also argues that the archaeology suggests that the return was a "trickle", taking place over perhaps decades, resulting in a maximum population of perhaps 30,000. Philip R. Davies called the authenticity of the decree "dubious", citing Grabbe and adding that J. Briend argued against "the authenticity of Ezra 1.1–4 is J. Briend, in a paper given at the Institute Catholique de Paris on 15 December 1993, who denies that it resembles the form of an official document but reflects rather biblical prophetic idiom."

Mary Joan Winn Leith believes that the decree in Ezra might be authentic and along with the Cylinder that Cyrus, like earlier rules, was through these decrees trying to gain support from those who might be strategically important, particularly those close to Egypt which he wished to conquer. He also wrote that "appeals to Marduk in the cylinder and to Yahweh in the biblical decree demonstrate the Persian tendency to co-opt local religious and political traditions in the interest of imperial control." Darius the Great, after the short-lived rule of Cambyses, came to power over the Persian Empire and ordered the completion of the Temple. This was undertaken with the stimulus of the earnest counsels and admonitions of the prophets Haggai and Zechariah. It was ready for consecration in the spring of 515 BCE, more than twenty years after the Jews' return from exile.

=== Haman and the Jews ===
In the Book of Esther, Haman is described as an Agagite noble and vizier of the Persian Empire under Persian King Ahasuerus, generally identified by biblical scholars as possibly being Xerxes I in the 6th century BCE. Haman and his wife Zeresh instigated a plot to murder all the Jews of ancient Persia. The plot was foiled by Queen Esther and Mordechai; and, as a result, Haman and his ten sons were hanged. The events of the Book of Esther are celebrated on the Jewish holiday Purim.

=== The Parthian Period ===
Jewish sources contain no mention of the Parthian influence and the name "Parthia" does not occur. The Armenian prince Sanatroces, of the royal house of the Arsacides, is mentioned in the "Small Chronicle" as one of the successors (diadochoi) of Alexander. Among other Asiatic princes, the Roman rescript in favor of the Jews reached Prince Arsaces as well (I Macc. xv. 22); it is not, however, specified which Arsaces (Arsaces I or Asaces II). Not long after, the Partho-Babylonian country was invaded by a Jewish army. The Syrian king, Antiochus Sidetes, marched against the Parthians in company with Hyrcanus I. When the allied armies defeated the Parthians (129 BCE) at the Great Zab (Lycus), the king ordered a ceasefire of two days on account of the Jewish Sabbath and Shavuot. In 40 BCE, the Jewish puppet-king, Hyrcanus II, fell into the hands of the Parthians who cut off his ears to render him unfit for rulership. The Jews of Babylonia, it seems, intended to create a high-priesthood for the exiled Hyrcanus, independent of the Land of Israel. However, the reverse happened: the Judean Jews accepted a Babylonian Jew, Ananel, as their High Priest which indicates the high esteem in which the Jews of Babylonia were held. In religious matters the Babylonians, like the rest of the Diaspora, were dependent upon the Land of Israel and Jerusalem in particular, to which they were expected to travel in order to observe the festivals.

The Parthian Empire was an enduring empire based on a loosely configured system of vassal kings. This lack of a rigidly centralized rule over the empire had its drawbacks, such as the rise of a Jewish bandit-state in Nehardea (see Anilai and Asinai). Yet, the tolerance of the Arsacid dynasty was as legendary as the first Persian dynasty, the Achaemenids. There is even an account that indicates the conversion of a small number of Parthian vassal kings of Adiabene to Judaism. These instances and others show not only the tolerance of Parthian kings, as they are also a testament to the extent to which the Parthians saw themselves as heirs to the preceding empire of Cyrus the Great. The Parthians were very protective of the Jewish minority as reflected in the old Jewish saying "When you see a Parthian charger chained to a tombstone in the Land of Israel, the hour of the Messiah will be near".

The Babylonian Jews wanted to fight in common cause with their Judean brethren against Vespasian; but it was not until the Romans waged war under Trajan against Parthia that they acted. To a large extent, the revolt of the Babylonian Jews meant that the Romans did not become masters of Babylonia. Philo speaks of the large number of Jews residing in that country, a population which was no doubt considerably swelled by new immigrants after the destruction of Jerusalem. Accustomed in Jerusalem from early times to look to the East for help, and aware, as the Roman procurator Petronius was, that the Jews of Babylon could render effectual assistance, Babylonia became with the fall of Jerusalem the very bulwark of Judaism. The collapse of the Bar Kochba revolt no doubt added to the number of Jewish refugees in Babylon.

Possibly it was recognition of services thus rendered by the Jews of Babylonia, and by the House of David in particular, that induced the Parthian kings to elevate the princes of the Exile, who until then had been little more than mere tax collectors, to the dignity of real princes, called Resh Galuta. Thus, then, the numerous Jewish subjects were provided with a central authority which ensured an undisturbed development of their own internal affairs.

== Sassanid period ==
By the early 3rd century, Persian influences were on the rise again. In the winter of 226 CE, Ardashir I overthrew the last Parthian king (Artabanus IV), destroyed the rule of the Arsacids, and founded the illustrious dynasty of the Sassanids. While Hellenistic influence had been felt amongst the religiously tolerant Parthians, the Sassanids intensified the Persian side of life, favored the Pahlavi language, and restored the old monotheistic religion of Zoroastrianism which became the official state religion. This resulted in the suppression of other religions. A priestly Zoroastrian inscription from the time of King Bahram II (276–293 CE) contains a list of religions (including Judaism, Christianity, Buddhism etc.) that Sassanid rule claimed to have "smashed".

Shapur I (Or Shvor Malka, which is the Aramaic form of the name) was friendly to the Jews. His friendship with Shmuel gained many advantages for the Jewish community. According to rabbinical sources, Shapur II's mother was Jewish, and this gave the Jewish community relative freedom of religion and many advantages. He was also friend of a Babylonian rabbi in the Talmud named Raba; Raba's friendship with Shapur II enabled him to secure a relaxation of the oppressive laws enacted against the Jews in the Persian Empire. In addition, Raba sometimes referred to his top student Abaye with the term Shvur Malka meaning "Shaput [the] King" because of his quick intellect.

The wife of Yazdgerd I and the mother of Bahram V was Shushandukht, who was the daughter of Exilarch Huna b. Nathan. Shushandukht secured many benefits for the Jewish community and ordered construction of Jewish neighborhoods in Shushtar, Susa, Hamedan and Isfahan. Some historians such as Ernst Herzfeld suggested that the Tomb of Esther and Mordechai in Hamedan might be the tomb of Shushandukht.

Both Christians and Jews suffered occasional persecution; but the latter, dwelling in more compact masses in cities like Isfahan, were not exposed to such general persecutions as broke out against the more isolated Christians. In the 5th century, the Jews suffered from persecution during the reigns of Yazdegerd II and Peroz.

== Early Islamic period (634 to 1255) ==
At the time of Islamic conquest of Persia, Jews were heavily under the pressure of the Sassanid rulers. Several Jewish religious figures were executed and the Jewish community was under pressure. Furthermore the city was left defenseless after the city's commander Firozan fled upon Arab arrival as happened in most cities and regions of Iran, partly due to popular dissatisfaction. Thus, many Jews welcomed the Arab armies with open arms. One of the Jews of Isfahan, "Abu Naeem", wrote in the "stories of the news of Isfahan" that Jews rushed to the gates of Isfahan to open the gates for the Arabs. He further wrote that many took musical instruments to make a feast. These Jews believed that the time of the Messiah is coming. Amnon Netzer believes that this story demonstrates that the Jews were the majority of the population of Isfahan at the time, since this act was likely to enrage the local Zoroastrians.

After the Islamic conquest of Persia, Jews, along with Christians and Zoroastrians, were assigned the status of dhimmis, inferior subjects of the Islamic empire. Dhimmis were allowed to practice their religion, but were forced to pay taxes (jizya, a poll tax, and initially also kharaj, a land tax) in favor of the Arab Muslim conquerors, and as a compensation for being excused from military service and payment of poor tax incumbent on Muslims. Dhimmis were also required to submit to a number of social and legal disabilities; they were prohibited from bearing arms, riding horses, testifying in courts in cases involving a Muslim, and frequently required to wear clothes that clearly distinguished them from Muslims. Although some of these restrictions were sometimes relaxed, the overall condition of inequality remained in force until the Mongol invasion. The 10th-century Persian historian Estakhri reports that :

All of the land from Isfahan to Tustar (Shushtar) was settled by Jews in such large numbers that the whole area was called Yahudistan (land of the Jews).

== Mongol rule (1256 to 1318) ==
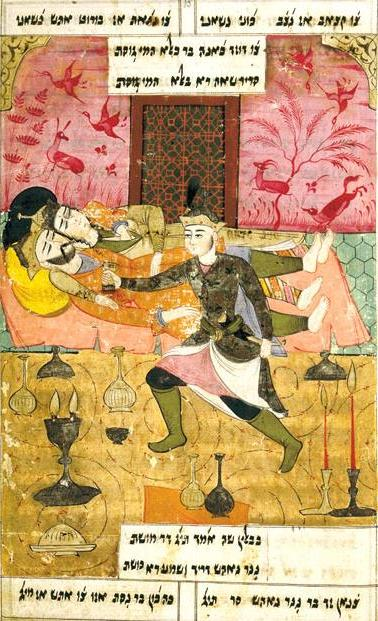
Hebrew version of Nizami's "Khosrow va Shirin".

In 1255, Mongols led by Hulagu Khan began a charge on Persia, and in 1257 they captured Baghdad, thus ending the Abbasid caliphate. In Persia and surrounding areas, the Mongols established a division of the Mongol Empire known as the Ilkhanate. The Ilkhanate considered all religions equal, and Mongol rulers abolished the unequal status of the dhimmi classes. One of the Ilkhanate rulers, Arghun Khan, even preferred Jews and Christians for administrative positions and appointed Sa'd al-Daula, a Jew, as his vizier. The appointment, however, provoked resentment from the Muslim clergy. After Arghun's death in 1291, Sa'd al-Daula was murdered and Persian Jews suffered a period of violent clergy-instigated persecutions from the Muslim populace. The contemporary Christian historian Bar Hebraeus wrote that of the violence committed against the Jews during that period "neither tongue can utter, nor the pen write down".

Ghazan Khan's conversion to Islam in 1295 heralded for Persian Jews a pronounced turn for the worse, as they were once again relegated to the status of dhimmis. Öljeitü, Ghazan Khan's successor, pressured some Jews to convert to Islam. The most famous such convert was Rashid al-Din Hamadani, a physician, historian and statesman, who adopted Islam in order to advance his career at Öljeitü's court. However, in 1318 he was executed on fake charges of poisoning Öljeitü; for several days, crowds carried his head around his native city of Tabriz, chanting "This is the head of the Jew who abused the name of God; may God's curse be upon him!" About 100 years later, Miran shah destroyed Rashid al-Din's tomb, and his remains were reburied at the Jewish cemetery. Rashid al-Din's case illustrates a pattern that differentiated the treatment of Jewish converts in Persia from their treatment in most other Muslim lands, where converts were welcomed and easily assimilated into the Muslim population. In Persia, however, Jewish converts were usually stigmatized on account of their Jewish ancestry for many generations.

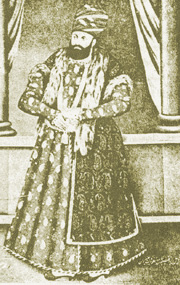
Haj Ebrahim Kalantar Shirazi was instrumental in ending the Zand dynasty. Nasser al-Din Shah Qajar always referred to him as Jewish.

== Safavid and Qajar dynasties (1502 to 1925) ==
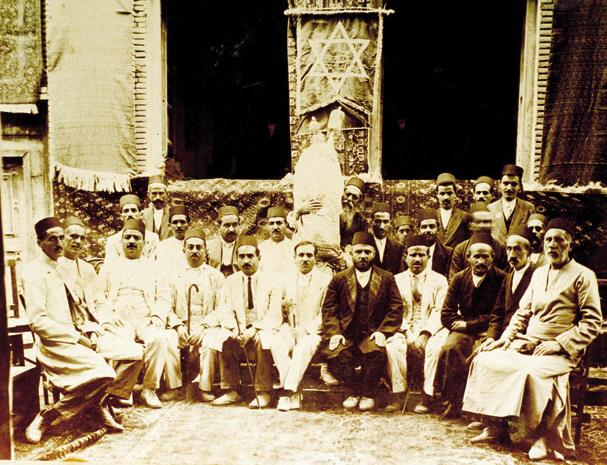
Hamedan Jews in 1918.

Further deterioration in the treatment of Persian Jews occurred during the reign of the Safavids who proclaimed Shi'a Islam the state religion. Shi'ism assigns great importance to the issues of ritual purity—tahara, and non-Muslims, including Jews, were deemed to be ritually unclean—najis—so that physical contact with them would require Shi'as to undertake ritual purification before doing regular prayers. Thus, Persian rulers, and to an even larger extent, the populace, sought to limit physical contact between Muslims and Jews. Jews were not allowed to attend public baths with Muslims or even to go outside in rain or snow, ostensibly because some impurity could be washed from them upon a Muslim.

The reign of Shah Abbas I (1588–1629) was initially benign. Jews prospered throughout Persia and were even encouraged to settle in Isfahan, which was made a new capital. However, toward the end of his rule, the treatment of Jews became harsher; upon advice from a Jewish convert to Islam and Shi'a clergy, the Shah forced Jews to wear a distinctive badge on clothing and headgear. In 1656, all Jews were expelled from Isfahan, because of the common belief of their impurity, and forced to convert to Islam. However, as it became known that the converts continued to practice Judaism in secret and because the treasury suffered from the loss of jizya collected from the Jews, they were allowed to revert to Judaism in 1661. However, they were still required to wear a distinctive patch upon their clothing.

Jews were often only permitted to pursue trades that were undesirable to the general Muslim population. They were expected to "undertake dirty work of every kind." Examples of such professions included dyeing (which contained strong unpleasant odors), scavenger work, cleaning excrement pits, singers, musicians, dancers and so on. By 1905, many Jews of Isfahan were trading opium. This commerce, which was very profitable, involved trade with India and China. The head of Isfahan Jewry was known to have contacts with the house of David Sassoon.

=== Afsharid dynasty (1736–1747) ===
Under Nadir Shah, an ostensibly Sunni leader, Jews experienced a period of relative tolerance when they were allowed to settle in the Shi'ite holy city of Mashhad. Nader even employed many Jews in sensitive positions and he brought Jewish administrators as protectors of his treasures from India.

Nader also ordered Jewish holy books to be translated into Persian. Upon the completion of the translation, Nadir Shah presented the sages of Israel with robes of honor and gifts. At nights in the royal assembly, the chief Mulla (Rabbi) of the kingdom [Mulla-Bashi] would read and interpret for the king, sometimes from the Torah and sometimes from the Psalms, which the king enjoyed greatly. He promised, "I will take Russia, I will rebuild Jerusalem and I will gather all the Children of Israel together." However, death overtook him and did not allow him to do so.

The Jews became prominent in trade in Mashhad, and established commercial relationships with the British, who favored dealing with them. After the assassination of Nader in 1747, Jews turned to the British traders and Sunni Turkomens for political support. At the time, Jews formed close ties with the British and provided banking support and intelligence for them.

=== Zand dynasty ===
The Zand dynasty had a more complex relationship with the Jewish community. They enjoyed the Shah's protection in Shiraz, but when the forces of Karim Khan took Basra in 1773, many Jews were killed, their properties were looted, and their women were raped. A document named "The Scroll of Persia" by Rabbi Ya'cov Elyashar compares the protected status of Jews in Ottoman Empire, with the weak condition of Jews in Iran. A Dutch traveller to Shiraz at the time of Karim Khan states: "Like most of the cities of the east, the Jews of Shiraz dwell in a separate quarter of their own, and they live, at least outwardly, in great poverty."

The British officer William Francklin who visited Shiraz after Karim Khan's death wrote :

"The Jews of Shiraz have a quarter of the city allotted to themselves, for which they pay a considerable tax to the government, and are obliged to make frequent presents. These people are more odious to the Persians than any other faith, and every opportunity is taken to oppress and extort money from them, the very boys on the street are accustomed to beat and insult them, of which treatment they dare not complain"

=== Qajar dynasty ===
The Zand dynasty came to an end when Lotf Ali Khan Zand was murdered by the Aqa Muhammad Khan Qajar. An instrumental figure in ascension of Aqa Muhammad Khan Qajar to the throne and defeat of Lotf Ali Khan was Hajj Ebrahim Khan Kalantar, whom Naser al-Din Shah Qajar always referred to as Jewish. However Aqa Muhammad Khan's successor, Fath-Ali Shah Qajar did not trust Haji Ebrahim and had him executed. Later, Hajj Ebrahim's daughter married the new prime minister and formed the influential Qavam family which remained influential in Iran for at least two centuries. Despite the early cooperation between Jews and Qajars, the Jews eventually suffered under their leadership. The Qajars were also Shia Muslims and many Shia anti-Jewish laws were reinstated. Rabbi David Hillel who visited Persia in 1827 wrote of a forced conversion shortly before his trip. Stern who was a Jewish-Christian missionary wrote that all merchants in Vakil Bazaar are ethnic Jews who, in order to save themselves from death, rebuke the faith of their fathers constantly.

After a trip to Europe in 1873, Naser al-Din Shah Qajar improved his relationship towards the Jewish community and relaxed certain restrictions. However this relaxation was not perceived positively by the masses and the Shia clergy. An 1875 letter from the Tehran Jewish community indicates although the Shah is a "righteous king and a lover of all the seed of the Jews as the apple of his eye" and "he and his deputy are Jews' Lovers the gentile masses are accustomed to mistreating the Jews. In 1876, in accordance to pressure from Moses Montefiore, the Iranian government improved the living conditions of the Jews and reduced their taxes. In 1881, Sir William Taylour Thomson finally succeeded to force the Shah to abolish the Jizya tax for the Persian Jewry.

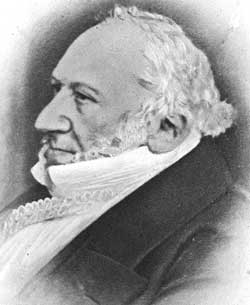
Sir Moses Montefiore pressured the British government to abolish the laws regarding Jaziya(Special tax for the Jews) in Iran.

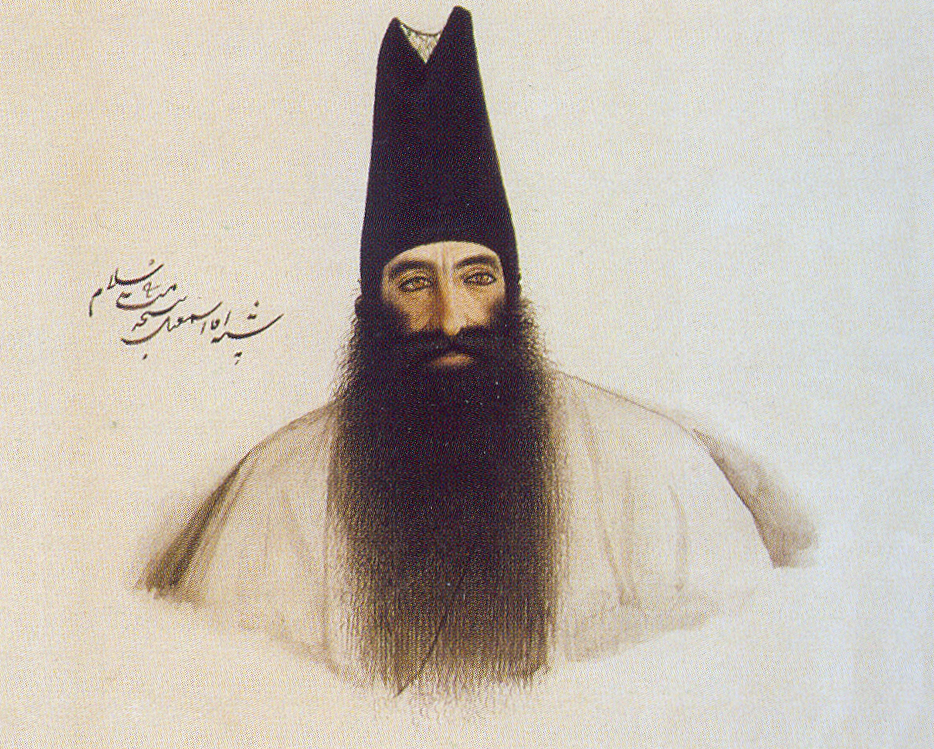
َAgha Esmail Jaded ol-Eslam was Nasser al-Din Shah's favorite servant. He was from a Jewish Isfahani family that converted to Islam.

=== Harassment of Jews in Persia ===
In the middle of the 19th century, J. J. Benjamin wrote about the life of Persian Jews:

"they are obliged to live in a separate part of town … for they are considered as unclean creatures. … Under the pretext of their being unclean, they are treated with the greatest severity and should they enter a street, inhabited by Mussulmans, they are pelted by the boys and mobs with stones and dirt. … For the same reason, they are prohibited to go out when it rains; for it is said the rain would wash dirt off them, which would sully the feet of the Mussulmans. … If a Jew is recognized as such in the streets, he is subjected to the greatest insults. The passers-by spit in his face, and sometimes beat him … unmercifully. … If a Jew enters a shop for anything, he is forbidden to inspect the goods. … Should his hand incautiously touch the goods, he must take them at any price the seller chooses to ask for them. ... Sometimes the Persians intrude into the dwellings of the Jews and take possession of whatever please them. Should the owner make the least opposition in defense of his property, he incurs the danger of atoning for it with his life. ... If ... a Jew shows himself in the street during the three days of the Katel (Muharram) … he is sure to be murdered."

In 1868, British chargé d'affaires in Iran Sir William Taylour Thomson wrote Iranian Jews are "mostly very poor and excepting in Tehran and some major cities, are much prosecuted and oppressed by the Mahometans (muslims)."

Often, Iranian central government wished to help the Jews, but did not have enough influence in places where local rulers and Shia clergy were powerful. In one incident of this type in Hamedan in 1875, an argument occurred between a Jewish goldsmith and a customer, eventually a crowd gathered and the goldsmith was accused of blaspheming Islam, a crime worthy of capital punishment in Islamic legal law. People started beating the Jew. He fled to a Mujtahid's (Islamic Scholar) house who sought to send him to the government authorities. However people were so angry, that they broke into the house and killed him and burned his body. Sir William Taylour Thomson contacted Iranian authorities about this matter and a levy tax was imposed on all Muslim population of the city. This angered the population even more and all of them gathered to stone the Jew, the governor and Shah's agents. Jewish board of deputees sent gratitude to William Taylour Thomson for intervening on behalf of the Jews.

The following street song which was common in Tehran in the 19th century demonstrates the negative view of average Persian Muslim towards the Persian Jews:

The Jew (Originally Juhud (Persian:جهود), a negative term meaning Jew) who is without honor, Is a nuisance from head to toe, He is a lie from toe to head, May scum cover his father's grave, He is an enemy of the religion of Islam, Don't call him a Jew, he is an infidel, His scarf, his gown and his shirt, His property, his children and his wife, Don't say they are bad, for they belong to you, Take them and screw them, they are lawful to you.

In the 19th century, there were many instances of forced conversions and massacres, usually inspired by the Shi'a clergy. In 1830, the Jews of Tabriz were massacred; the same year saw a forcible conversion of the Jews of Shiraz. In 1839, the Allahdad occurred, many Jews were massacred in Mashhad and survivors were forcibly converted. However, European travellers later reported that the Jews of Tabriz and Shiraz continued to practice Judaism in secret despite a fear of further persecutions. Many of these jews started a dual life as Anusim. One of these converts described their life as follows:

All Jews who converted to Islam had two names: for example, my grandfather had the Muslim name Sheikh Abul-Qasim and the Hebrew name Benjamin. My father's Muslim name was Ibrahim and his Hebrew name was Abraham. Outside the house they called me Musa and at home they called me Moshe. During my father's lifetime, most Jews had very Islamic names. They even went to Mecca and performed the Hajj.

In 1860, Jews of Hamedan were accused of mocking the ta'ziyeh ceremonies for Husayn ibn Ali, several of them were fined and some had their ears and noses cut off as punishment. Jews of Barforush were forcibly converted in 1866; when they were allowed to revert to Judaism, thanks to an intervention by the French and British ambassadors, a mob killed 18 Jews of Barforush, burning 2 of them alive. A representative of the Alliance Israélite Universelle, a Jewish humanitarian and educational organization, wrote from Tehran in 1894: "every time that a priest wishes to emerge from obscurity and win a reputation for piety, he preaches war against the Jews".

In 1910, the Jews of Shiraz were accused of ritually murdering a Muslim girl. Muslim dwellers of the city plundered the whole Jewish quarter; the first to start looting were the soldiers sent by the local governor to defend the Jews against the enraged mob. Twelve Jews, who tried to defend their property, were killed, and many others were injured.

==== Regional differences ====
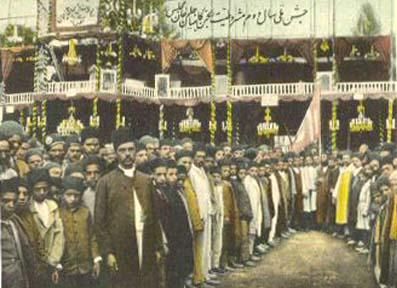
Iranian Jews actively took part in the Persian Constitutional Revolution. Seen here is a Jewish gathering celebrating the second anniversary of the Constitutional Revolution in Tehran.

Lord Curzon described the regional differences in the situation of the Persian Jews in the 19th century:

"In Isfahan, where they are said to be 3,700 and where they occupy a relatively better status than elsewhere in Persia, they are not permitted to wear kolah or Persian headdress, to have shops in the bazaar, to build the walls of their houses as high as a Moslem neighbour's, or to ride in the street. In Teheran and Kashan they are also to be found in large numbers and enjoying a fair position. In Shiraz they are very badly off. In Bushire they are prosperous and free from persecution."

One European traveler in 1880 wrote: "Hatred [harboured by the gentiles of Kermanshah] toward the Jews is not as overdone as in central Persia". In 1860, Rabbi Y. Fischel said about the Jews of Isfahan as beaten "from all sides by the gentiles."

Another European traveler reported a degrading ritual to which Jews were subjected for public amusement:

At every public festival—even at the royal salaam [salute], before the King's face—the Jews are collected, and a number of them are flung into the hauz or tank, that King and mob may be amused by seeing them crawl out half-drowned and covered with mud. The same kindly ceremony is witnessed whenever a provincial governor holds high festival: there are fireworks and Jews.

In other times, the attacks on the Jews were related to their association with the foreigners. An event of this sort occurred in 1836, when Elyas – a Jewish banker for the British Residency in Bushehr – "was attacked for doing its business in the bazaar." Anti-Jewish acts were sometimes linked to resentment of European powers.

In January 1924, the Jewish Telegraph Agency reported that a mob of Muslims had attacked the Jewish population of Tehran, and injured six Jews, but were prevented from killing anyone by the intervention of the police.

==== Jewish community's international relations ====
In this time, Iranian Jews who were aware of the growing influence of European Jews in global affairs turned to them for assistance. In 1840, the Jewish community of Hamedan sent an envoy, Nissim Bar Selomah, to meet Western Jewry. He went to England and met with Moses Montefiore, who provided "certificates" against the accusations of the Jews.

From 1860, many attempts were made by the Persian Jewish community to secure assistance from European Jews against Muslims. These requests were full of descriptions of poverty and persecution faced by Jews in Persia. The following is one example of such requests:

"Allow us to present our supplications to you. You would not want your brethren, your own flesh and blood, to perish in frightful penury, to be victims of renewed persecutions which awaits them with each passing day. We are subject to the scorn of our enemies (Muslims) who view us as defenseless and do with us whatever they like. We live every day, hour and moment of our lives in constant dread of some new tragedy which they might bring upon us. our lives, property, honor, everything that is dear to us is at the mercy of their anger and hostility, a situation which is worse than slavery. Apostate Jews have the right to inherit their parents entire estate, the widow and orphans who did not abandon their faith must hand over their property to the apostate. A Muslim who kills a Jew will not go to a trial, even if there were witnesses to the crime, the Muslim will pay at most a fine for his deed. We are groaning under the burden of disgraceful taxes.

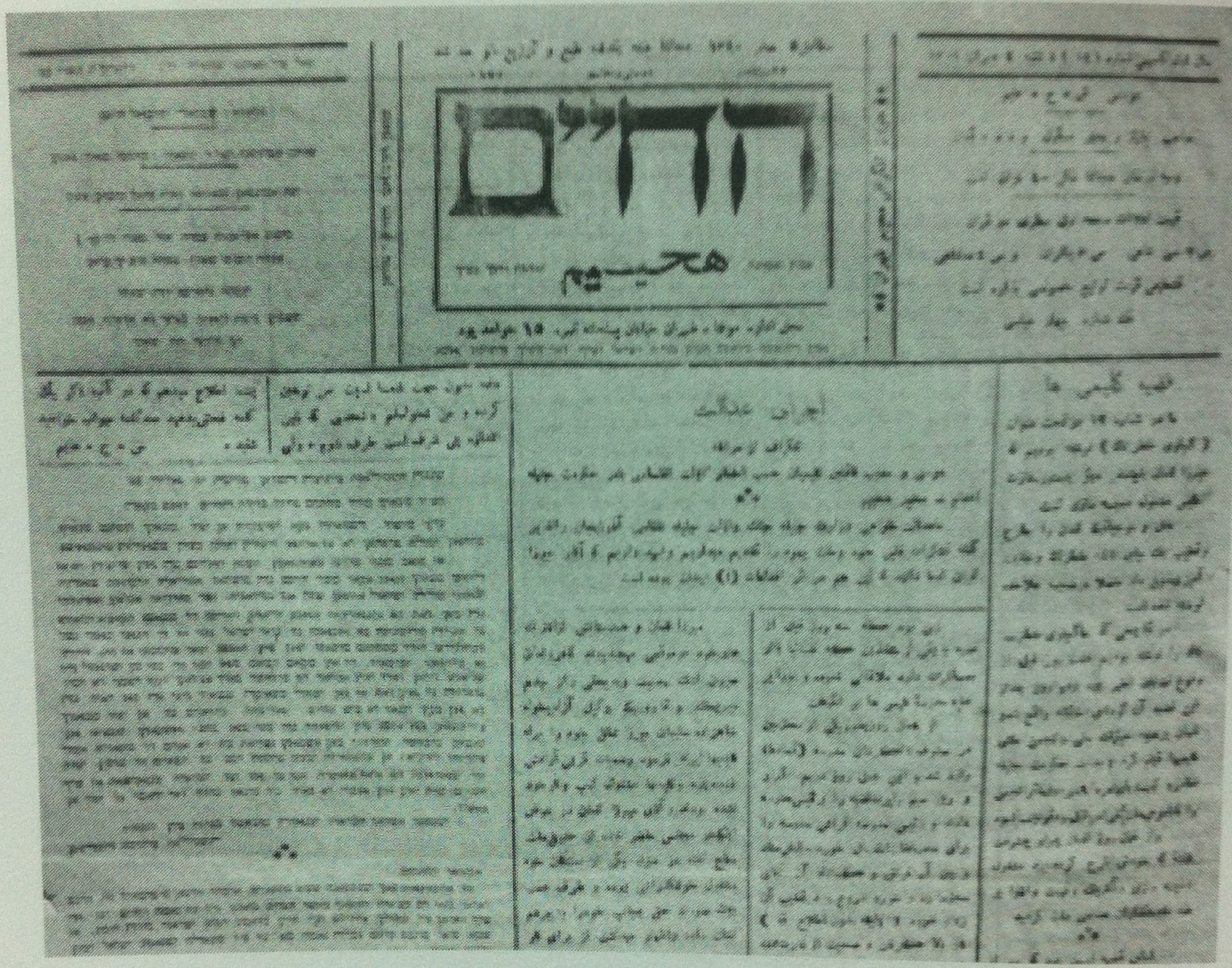
The newspaper of Iranian Jews between 1921 and 1925 called Ha-Haim.

Representatives of the Alliance Israélite Universelle recorded numerous instances of persecution and debasement of Persian Jews. In many of these cases, envoys from foreign governments such as British, French and Ottoman intervened on behalf of the Jews to avoid more serious repercussions. Three international Jewish organizations (Alliance Israélite Universelle, Anglo-Jewish Association and Board of Deputies of British Jews) and two key people (Adolphe Crémieux and Moses Montefiore) were instrumental in securing equal rights for the Iranian Jews and protecting Jews in antisemitic incidents.

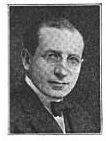
Rabbi Joseph Saul Kornfeld, American Ambassador to Persia.

With the growing influence of United States in international affairs, many American Jewish organizations such as American Jewish Joint Distribution Committee (JDC) actively intervened on behalf of Persian Jews. During the great famine of Persia in 1917-1919, JDC representative Albert Lucas successfully convinced US government to donate 15,000 dollars (200,000 in 2015 USD) to Persian Jewry. The JDC of Philadelphia donated another 10,000 dollars in September 1918. Thus the casualty of famine amongst the Persian Jews was minimal in comparison to Persian gentiles. Furthermore, when the Jewish neighborhood of Broujerd was attacked by Loures, JDC sent a large number of donations. US ambassador Caldwell was also instrumental in helping the Jews of Broujerd.

In 1921, United States appointed Joseph Saul Kornfeld, a Jewish Rabbi, as its ambassador to Persia. This was the first time in the history of United States in which a Rabbi was appointed as an Ambassador. Kornfeld actively intervened on the behalf of Persian Jewry on many occasions. In one such event, Reza Shah ordered water to be cut off from the Jewish Ghetto of Tehran and Kornfeld successfully convinced Shah to resolve the matter.

By around 1950 representatives from World ORT, a Russian Jewish organization aimed at advancement of education in Jewish children started their first branch in Damavand street in Tehran. A woman's division later opened that year. First courses in masonry and carpentry were initiated that year for Kurdish and Iraqi Jewish refugees in Tehran. A year later branches were opened in Isfahan and Shiraz and curriculum were widened to dressmaking, joinery, marquetry and cabinet making. By 1954 ORT students grew to about 700 students. By 1969 student numbers had increased to over 2000. ORT continued its operation in Iran even after the Islamic revolution until it was shut down and nationalized by the government in 1980.

== Pahlavi dynasty (1925 to 1979) ==
The Pahlavi dynasty implemented modernizing reforms, which greatly improved the life of Jews. The influence of the Shi'a clergy was weakened, and the restrictions on Jews and other religious minorities were abolished.

=== Reza Shah (1925 to 1941) ===
Reza Shah prohibited mass conversion of Jews and eliminated the Shi'ite concept of ritual uncleanness of non-Muslims. Modern Hebrew was incorporated into the curriculum of Jewish schools and Jewish newspapers were published. Jews were also allowed to hold government jobs. In 1915, two Jewish brothers, Mordechai and Asher ben Avaraham, opened the first Jewish newspaper called "Shalom". These changes moved the balance of power in the Jewish community from elders and Rabbis to the youth. The establishment of Zionist Organization of Persia further accelerated this transfer of power to the young Jews. The Jews of Persia understood that "Zion" is the biblical name of Jerusalem and Zionism demonstrates that end of exile and the beginning of redemption. The Persian Zionist Aziz ben Yona Naim wrote in the early 1920s :"Zionism is nothing but a new name and new institution, for the Zionist idea has been present in Jewish thought for over two thousands years."

In the wake of Zionist activity, many Persian Jews emigrated to Palestine. Many Persian Jews were poorer than their European brethren but nevertheless they enthusiastically bought Shekels, contributed to the national funds, and sought to be represented at Zionist Congress held in Europe. However this Zionist awakening led to bitter rivalry between two leaders of Jewish community: Loqman Nehourai and Shmuel Hayyim. Furthermore, even though Reza Shah was sympathetic to the Jews in the beginning, he became distrustful of Jewish movements with the growth of Zionism. Reza Shah sought to unite the different ethnic groups in Iran under the flag of nationalism. His main purpose was to fight communism, but he distrusted Zionism as well. Shah did not like the growing connection between European Jewry and Persian Jews. He further arrested Shmuel Hayyim and had him executed in 1931 under the charges of conspiracy to murder the Shah and change the form of government from constitutional monarchy to a republic. Jewish schools were closed in the 1920s.

==== Reza Shah and Nazi Germany ====
The impact of World War II on Iranian Jews is acknowledged by the United States Holocaust Memorial Museum. In the entry in the Holocaust Encyclopedia on "Iran During World War II," the following is stated:

Iranian Jews ruled by Reza Shah and later his son, Muhammad Reza Pahlavi, enjoyed many rights and freedoms that they had not previously experienced, including relative cultural and religious autonomy, increased economic opportunities, and significant political rights. Jews also benefitted from the Pahlavi tilt towards a more secular domestic policy. The Iranian government informed the Germans that it considered Iranian Jews to be fully assimilated Iranians. Reza Shah declared Iran neutral at the start of World War II. He feared both Soviet and British ambitions in his country and despite the benefits of economic relations with Germany, he considered Germany to be too committed to its program of race-based expansion and ideology. Neither side had Iran’s best interests in mind.

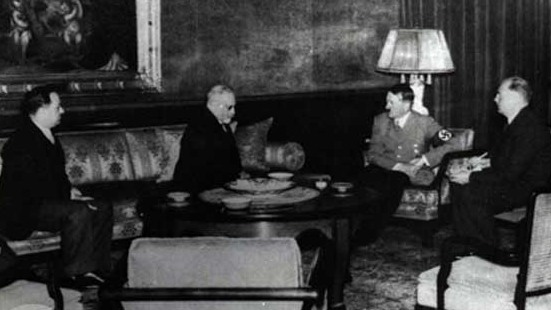
Hassan Esfandiary, and Musa Nuri Esfandiari, Iranian ambassador to the German Reich, meeting Adolf Hitler

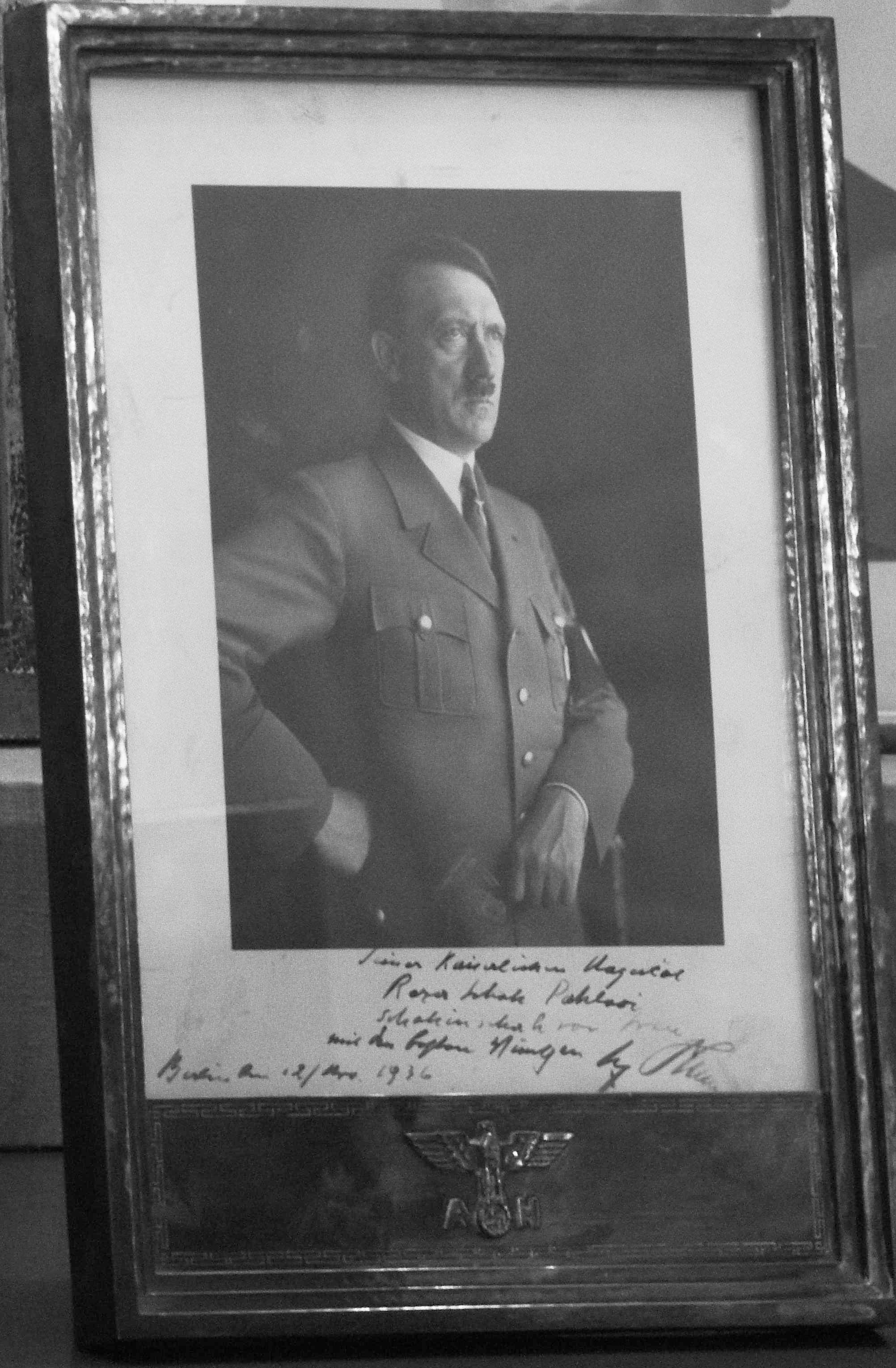
Signed Photograph of Adolf Hitler for Reza Shah Pahlavi in Original Frame with the Swastika and Adolf Hitler's (AH) Sign, Sahebgharanie Palace, Niavaran Palace Complex. The text below the photograph: His Imperial Majesty – Reza Shah Pahlavi – Shahanshah of Iran – With the Best Wishes – Berlin 12 March 1936 – The signature of Adolf Hitler

However, Reza Shah leaned in sympathy towards Germany, since, unlike Great Britain or the Soviet Union, Germany did not have a past record of interfering in, or occupying Iranian territory as an imperial power. Regardless, this made the Jewish community fearful of possible persecutions, especially due to anti-Jewish public sentiment at the time. There were many rumors in Iran that Hitler secretly had converted to Islam and had taken the name Heydar (the title of Imam Ali). The rumors stated that Hitler had a necklace depicting the picture of Imam Ali and was planning to reveal his true religion after defeating the deceitful British, the godless Russians and the Jews. A popular folk poem at the time said: "Imam is our supporter, Hossein is our master. If Germany doesn't arrive, dirt on our heads."

In 1936, the head of Reichsbank and the financial mastermind of Nazi Germany travelled to Tehran and many important commercial agreements were signed between the two countries. In 1939, Nazi Germany sent media with racial tones advocating for greater collaboration between Aryan Persians and Germans. In 1936, Iranians were partially classified as Aryans and were excluded from some Nuremberg laws due to Nazi Germany's desire to become closer to Iran. In furthering this, Hitler personally promised that if he defeated Russia, he would return all of the Persian land taken by Russians during the nineteenth and twentieth centuries.

Nazi Germany held regular broadcasts in Persian. Bahram Shahrukh, who was employed by German radio, performed fiery anti-Jewish broadcasts on a regular basis, but had limited reach. Some Persian Jews welcomed the idea of British troops to capture parts of Iran in 1942, rather than to see a German-aligned government take shape.

Some Jews joined the Tudeh party and advocated for communism, alongside a Muslim intellectual majority, and many racial minorities in Iran such as Assyrians and Armenians. Some Iranian Jews viewed communism as a Jewish movement since many leading members of the communist revolution in Russia were Jewish.

==== Tehran Children ====
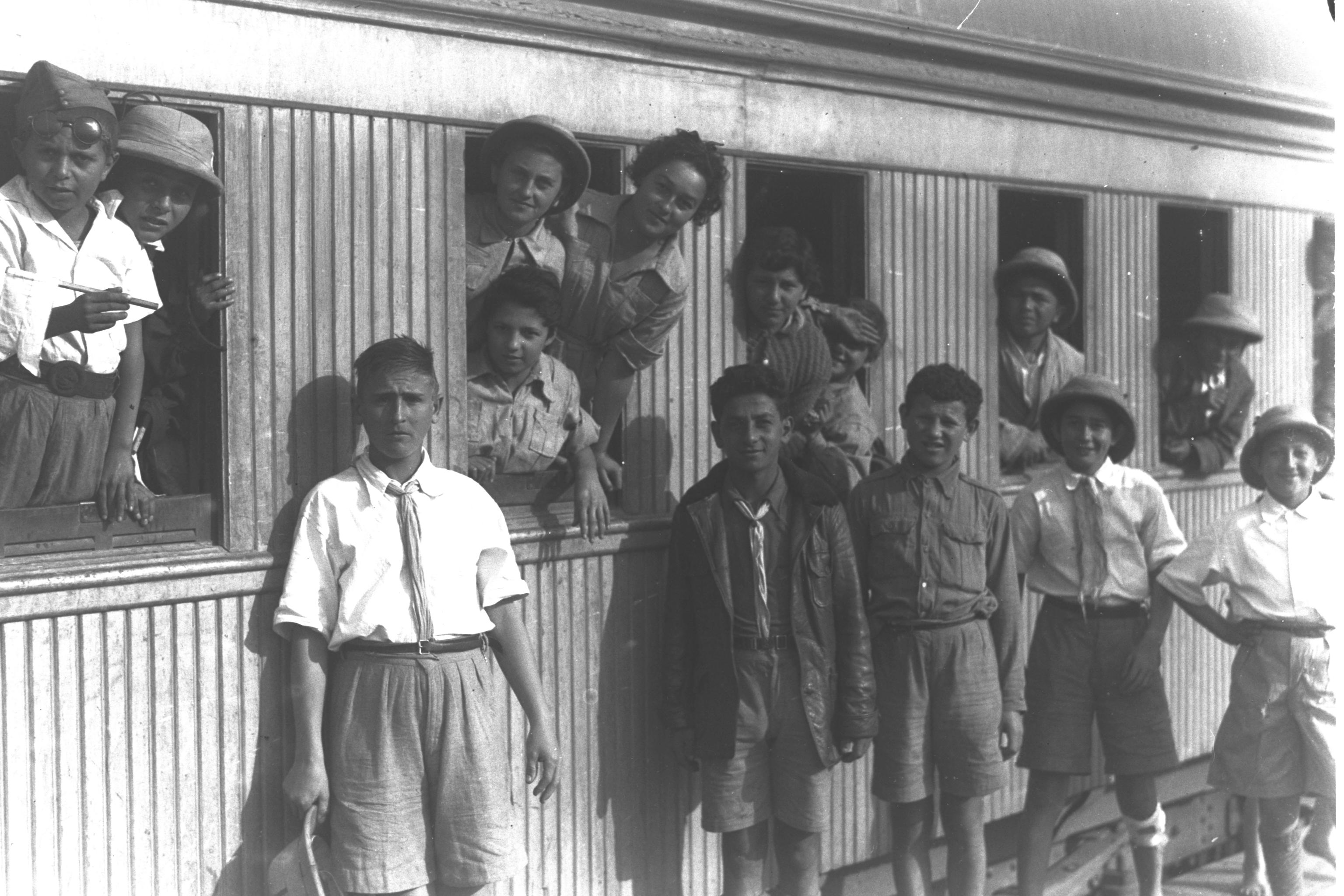
A group of "Teheran Children" in front of a railway carriage

Despite the Iranian people suffering from the 1942-1943 famine, Iran became a place of refuge for 116,000 Polish refugees, of whom, around 5,000 were Polish Jews. Iranians openly received them, supplying them with provisions. Young survivors who arrived in Iran became known as the 'Tehran Children'. Polish schools, cultural and educational organizations, shops, bakeries, businesses, and press were established to make the Poles feel more at home. The Iranian city Isfahan was briefly called "the City of Polish Children" because of the thousands of Polish orphans who settled there.

One of the refugees, Adam Szymel, recalling the moment he entered Iran, said:

Well, on the camp, there was on that ship there was just two of us. My mother stayed behind with my grandmother and two sisters. They left about two weeks later. We arrived in at that time was Persia, now it’s Iran. Port of Pahlavi ... Finally, we were free. We could really say we were free... It’s like when the weight is dropped off your shoulders. That you could speak freely without, you know, looking if someone is watching you. That you’re your own master, you’re free. I was 14 years old.

=== After the establishment of the state of Israel ===
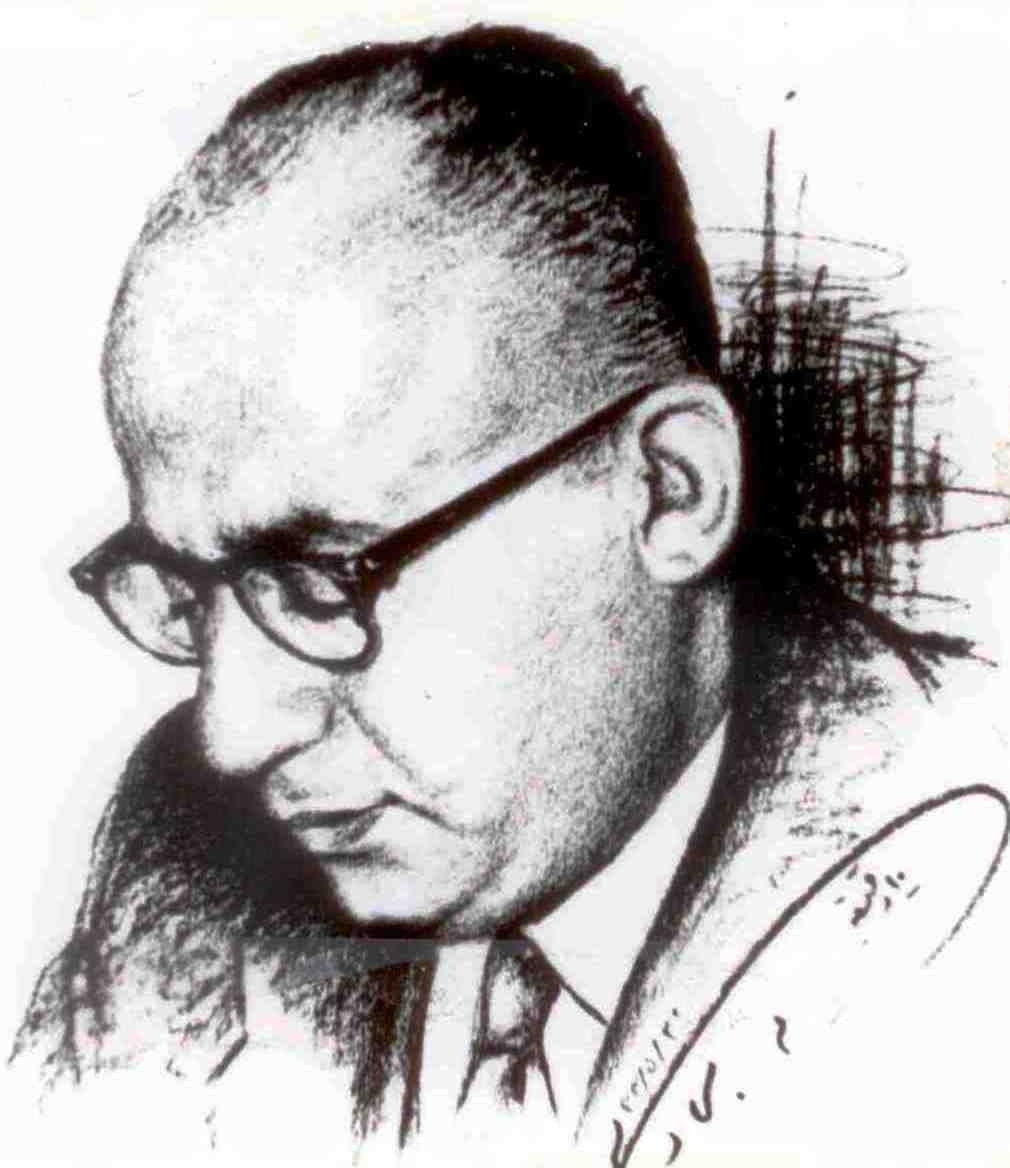
Portrait of Moshfegh Hamedani, 1954.

Anti-Jewish sentiment occurred after the establishment of the State of Israel in 1948 and continued until 1953, due to the weakening of the central government and strengthening of the clergy in the course of political struggles between the Shah and Prime Minister Mohammad Mosaddegh. The ideas of Mossadegh which promoted a democratic society with parliamentary monarchy appealed to many Iranian Jews. However many of these Jewish supporters did not approve of his relationship with the established anti-semitic clerical Muslim groups. Although Mossadegh viewed the establishment of the state of Israel as a form of colonialism, he had a good relationship with the Jewish community. On his trip to United States, a Jewish journalist, Raby Moshfegh Hamadani, was accompanying him and giving advice.

The most prominent anti-Israeli member of the government was Hossein Fatemi. Fatemi closed the office of the Jewish Agency on Israel's independence day in 1953. He also annulled an agreement permitting Israeli El Al airplanes to land in Iran. Fatemi, from time to time, published semi-official documents hinting that Iran no longer recognizes the state of Israel. However, Mossadegh himself continued commercial ties with the state of Israel and allowed the negotiations between the Bank Melli and Bank Leumi in Israel to continue.

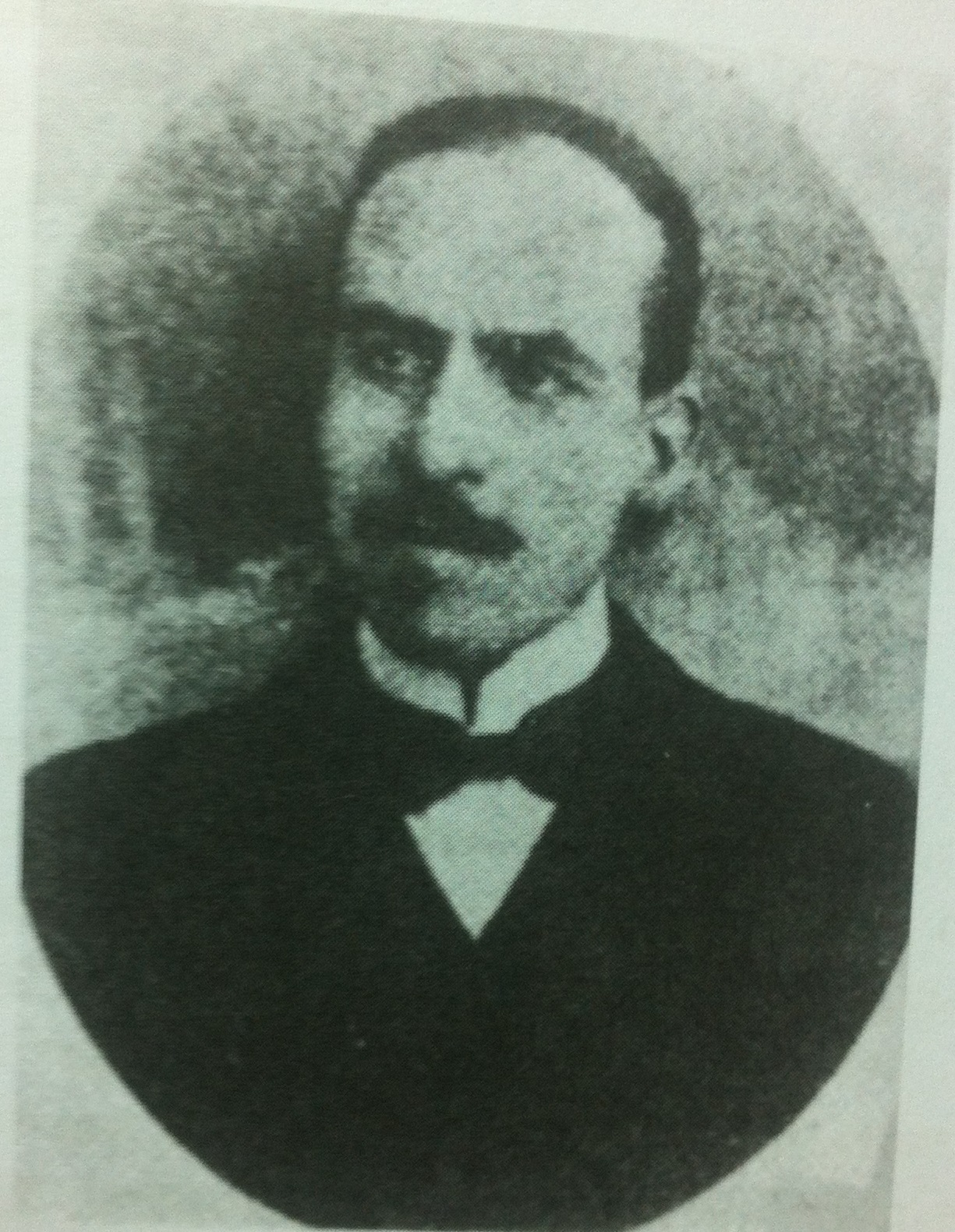
Shmuel Hayyim, leader of the Jewish community and Zionist movement in Persia, was arrested and executed by the order of Reza Shah.

The Six-Day War between Arabs and Israel in 1967 created a tense environment for Persian Jewry. During this time, the synagogues in Shiraz remained closed for more than ten weeks until Tisha B'Av for fear of attacks from Muslims masses. Jewish sources report that many gentiles tried to invade the Jewish ghetto and were dispersed by the police.

==== Under Shah Mohammad Reza Pahlavi (1941–1979) ====
After the 1953 deposition of Mossadegh, the reign of shah Mohammad Reza Pahlavi was the most prosperous era for the Jews of Iran. In the 1970s, only 10 percent of Iranian Jews were classified as impoverished; 80 percent were middle class and 10 percent wealthy. Although Jews accounted for only a small percentage of Iran's population, in 1979 they comprised two of the 18 members of the Iranian Academy of Sciences, 80 of the 4,000 university lecturers, and 600 of the 10,000 physicians nationwide. An important factor in economic improvement of the Jews was close relations between the Shah and the state of Israel. Details of this connection and how the condition of Iranian Jews improved dramatically in a few short years still awaits rigorous exploration.

Even though Mohammad Reza Pahlavi was very positive towards religious minorities, and especially Jews, in the beginnings of his reign as king, he displayed antisemitic tendencies in the last decade of his rule. During an interview with Mike Wallace in 1976, Shah spoke of a highly organized and influential Jewish lobby in the United States that controls banking, politics and media and is pushing people around for the interests of Israel.

Yousef Cohen, the last Jewish representative of the Iranian Senate, describes in his memoirs that Shah became suspicious of the Jewish community in his final years, because most of the international criticism about lack of freedom in Iran and military style of government came from Jewish authors. Shah, according to Cohen, displayed a remarkable intolerance and annoyance by the Jewish community in his last annual visit in March 1978 with the community leaders. Cohen describes that Shah believed that there is an international Jewish conspiracy against him to end his reign as the king.

In the summer of 1978, 7,000 Jews protested against the Shah in Ashura protests. Other estimates puts the Jewish participants in the protests as high as 12,000. Almost all the religious leaders of the Jewish community such as Yedidia Shofet, Uriel Davidi, David Shofet, Yosef Hamadani Cohen, Rabbi Baalnes, and Rabbi Yadegaran participated in the protests. Other non religious leaders of the Persian Jewish community such as Aziz Daneshrad, Haroun Yashayaei, Yaghoub Barkhordar, Hoshang Melamed, Manuchehr Eliasi and Farangis Hasidim also participated in the protests.

Leaders of the Jewish community such as Yosef Hamadani Cohen and Yedidia Shofet were instrumental in managing the collaborations between the Jews and the revolutionaries.

The most important Jewish supporters of the revolution were in "Association of Jewish Iranian Intellectuals" (Jameye-roshanfekran-e-yahudi or AJII). In 1978 AJII's magazine, Tammuz, started writing in support of the revolution. Its writers were not limited to Persian Jews but also included prominent non-Jewish revolutionaries such as Mir-Hossein Mousavi and Zahra Rahnavard. AJII's charter was very close to the ideals of the revolution. It declared that AJII was at war with imperialism in its all forms, including Zionism. Furthermore, AJII's charter declared that the organization is at war with racism including antisemitism.

Dr. Sapir Hospital, Tehran's only Jewish hospital, was instrumental in helping the wounded revolutionaries. At the time, most of the public hospitals would report the wounded revolutionaries to SAVAK but Dr. Sapir's hospital was the only hospital to treat without informing the SAVAK agents. Dr. Sapir Hospital's actions were so instrumental that Ayatollah Khomeini himself wrote a personal note thanking the hospital for its help after the revolution succeeded.

In November 1978, leaders of the Jewish community met with Ayatollah Taleqani and pledged their support for the revolution. In late 1978, leaders of the Jewish community met with Ayatollah Khomeini in Paris and declared their support for the revolution.

On March 16, 1979, Habib Elghanian, the honorary leader of the Jewish community, was arrested on charges of "corruption", "contacts with Israel and Zionism", "friendship with the enemies of God", "warring with God and his emissaries", and "economic imperialism". He was tried by an Islamic Revolutionary Tribunal, sentenced to death, and executed on May 8, one of 17 Iranian Jews executed as spies since the revolution. Elghanian's execution brought upon the condemnation of international Jewish organizations such as World Zionist Congress and the Anti Defamation League. Jewish senator Jacob Javits condemned the execution and asked US government to implement sanctions against Iran.

Three days after the execution, a group of Jews led by Yedidia Shofet went to Qom and met with Ayatollah Khomeini. Khomeini stressed that he differentiates between Zionism and Judaism and does not believe in common belief that all Jews are Zionists. The next day, Ettela'at newspaper titled that "We do not believe that all Jews are Zionists". One week later, Serge Klarsfeld went to Iran and met with Ibrahim Yazdi. Yazdi promised him that no Jew will be executed in Iran because of their Zionist beliefs. Klarsfeld left Iran after a few days of investigation and made a documentary in which he iterated that the Iranian government has executed Elghanian because of his Jewishness. On 18 May 1979, a group of Zionist leaders went to the Iranian embassy in Washington and met with Iranian delegates. In this meeting, the Iranian representative Ali Agoh stated that the Iranian government does not believe that Iranian Zionists are traitors.

=== Iran–Israel trade ===
Even though the new revolutionary government promoted heated anti-Israeli sentiments among its followers, many commercial ties were still maintained even after the revolution. After the revolution, selling Iranian oil was extremely difficult due to sanctions. Marc Rich, an Israeli-Swiss businessman, sent his Glencore executives to Tehran and established major commercial ties with the new government. Rich was the only businessman able to export Iranian oil from 1979 to 1995. He claimed in his biography that he exported Iranian oil to Israel through a secret pipeline between the two countries. He further claimed that both countries were aware of this transaction. Rich obtained military weapons for Iran during the Iran-Iraq war. On many occasions, Rich helped Mossad agents in Iran. For his actions on breaking the US sanctions against Iran, the US government found Marc Rich guilty and sentenced him. However, Rich was later pardoned by Bill Clinton in his last day in office in 2001. Former Mossad heads Avner Azoulay and Shabtai Shavit personally wrote to Clinton to argue for his pardon.

Furthermore, many other commercial ties still exist between Iran and Israel. Israel imports most of its pistachios from Iran, and this matter has angered California pistachio producers and the US government on many occasions. In 2011, Israeli company Ofer Brothers Group was on the list of companies that broke Iranian sanctions. Ynet reported that Israeli-Iranian trade, conducted covertly and illegally by dozens of Israeli companies, totals tens of millions of dollars a year. Much of this trade is conducted through a third country. Israel supplies Iran with fertilizer, irrigation pipes, hormones for milk production, seeds, and fruit; Iran, meanwhile, provides Israel with marble, cashews, and pistachios. Based on the same report in November 2000, the Iranian government asked an Israeli company, which built Tehran's sewage pipes 30 years earlier, to visit the country for renovations. Shortly afterwards, the assistant director-general of Iran's Ministry of Agriculture visited Israel secretly and stayed at the Tel Aviv Hilton Hotel. He expressed an interest in purchasing irrigation pipes, pesticides and fertilizers.

=== Situation of the Jews in Iran ===
The Supreme leader of Iran Khamenei has denied the Holocaust on multiple occasions

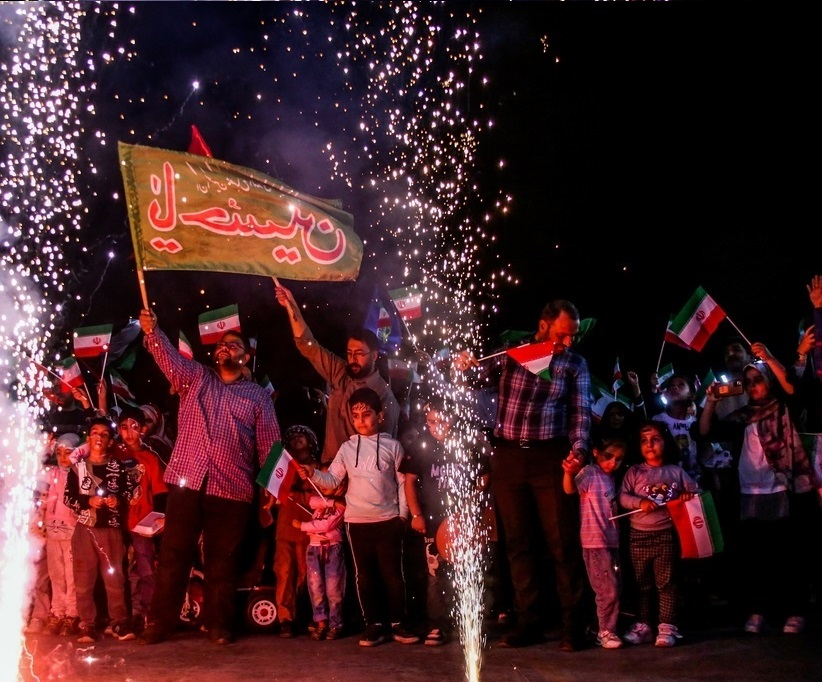
Popular Celebrations in Iran, 7 October 2023 supporting Hamas in Gaza war

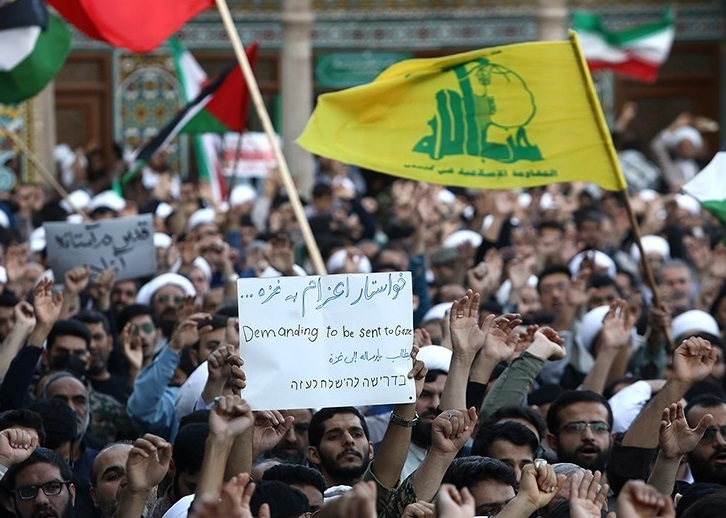
Demonstration in Iran against an Israeli attack on Gaza Hospital

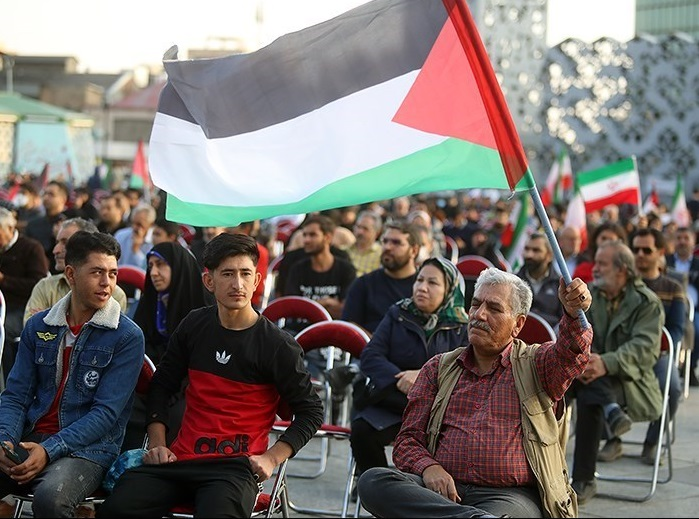
Iranians gathering in support of Palestine

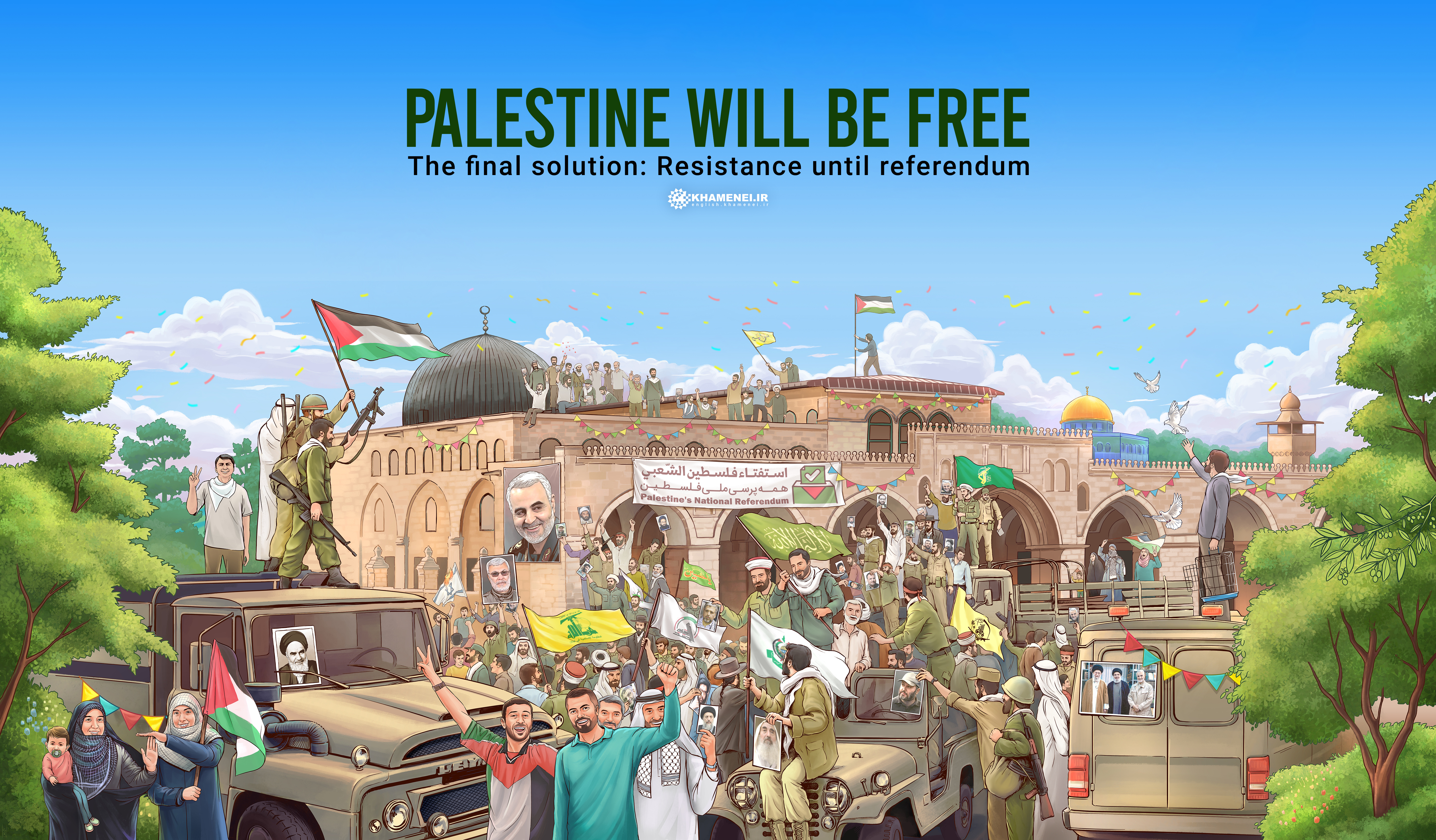
Iranian pro-Palestinian poster

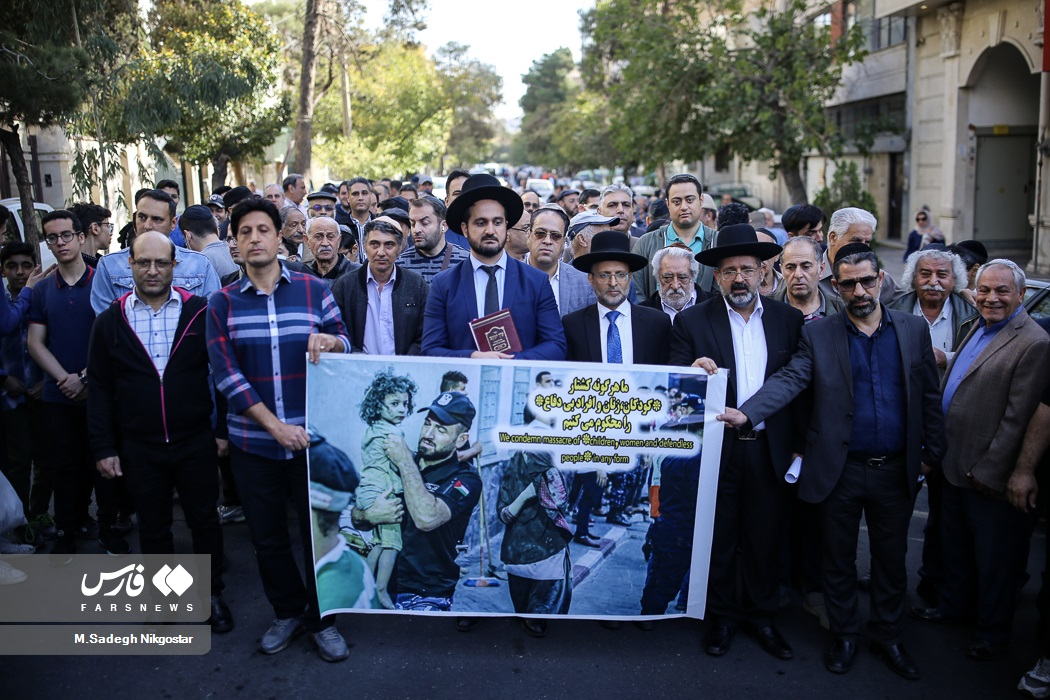
Gathering of Jews condemning Israeli actions against Palestinians, featuring Chief Rabbi of Iran Yehuda Gerami and Younes Hamami

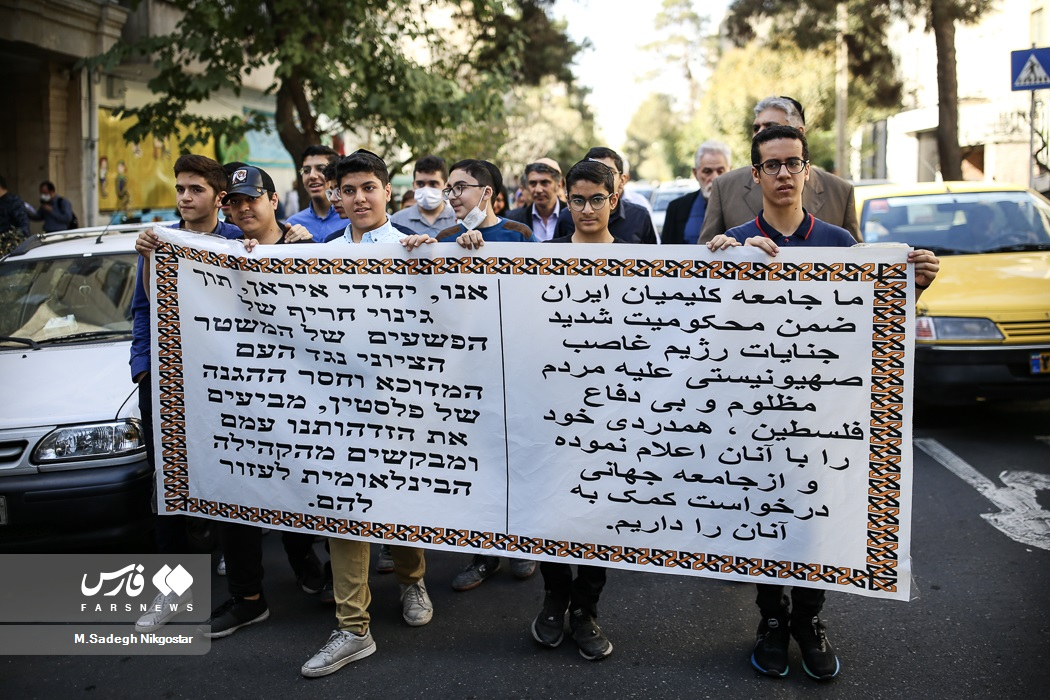
Gathering of Jews condemning the actions of Israel and supporting Palestine

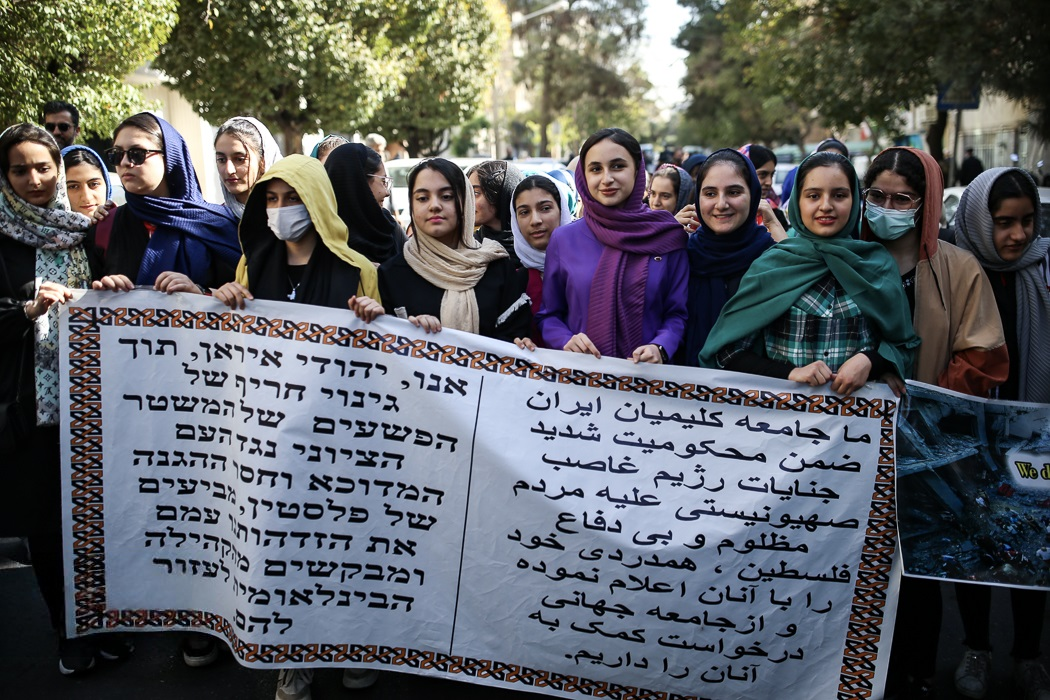
Gathering of Jews condemning the actions of Israel and supporting Palestine

Opinion over the condition of Jews in Iran is divided. Jewish film producer Haroun Yashayaei is active in arguing on behalf of a benevolent view of the Iranian Islamic government and society toward Jews. He tells visitors and reporters the Ayatollah "Ruhollah Khomeini didn't mix up our community with Israel and Zionism," and "Take it from me, the Jewish community here faces no difficulties." Privately, many Jews complain to foreign reporters of "discrimination, much of it of a social or bureaucratic nature." The Islamic government appoints the officials who run Jewish schools, most of these being Muslims and requires that those schools must open on Saturdays, the Jewish Sabbath. This was changed as of February 4, 2015. Criticism of this policy was the downfall of the last remaining newspaper of the Iranian Jewish community, which was closed in 1991 after it criticized government control of Jewish schools. Instead of expelling Jews en masse like in Libya, Iraq, Egypt, and Yemen, the Iranians have adopted a policy of keeping Jews in Iran.

The desire for survival may prompt Iranian Jews to overstate their anti-Israel positions. Their response to the questions regarding Israel have been outright denial of Israel or staying quiet. An example of the dilemma of Iranian Jews can be observed in this example:

"We hear the ayatollah say that Israel was cooperating with the Shah and SAVAK, and we would be fools to say we support Israel. So we just keep quiet about it... Maybe it will work out. Anyway, what can we do? This is our home."

On September 23, 2021, the wife of the Rabbi of Jews of Iran gave an interview to the Israeli newspaper Katifa. Most Iranian Jews say that they view Iran as their home and are allowed to practice Judaism freely, but there is suspicion and fear too. Despite their Pro-Iranian stance and their refusal to travel to Israel, the Jews of Iran are denounced for betraying Iran by showing loyalty to Israel.

However, Iranian Jews are allowed to visit Israel, even though Iranian passport holders are legally barred from doing so, often through Turkey, and return. Even the current chief rabbi of the Islamic Republic, Yehuda Gerami, who often shows pro revolutionary and anti-Zionist views, has studied in Yeshivas Ateres Yisrael in Jerusalem. In 2021, Iran's chief rabbi condemned the 2020 US assassination of Qasem Soleimani; in 2022 the Tehran Central Jewish Committee condemned the Mahsa Amini protests, saying "The community declares that it has always obeyed the position of the supreme leader" (referring to the Ayatollah Ali Khamenei). The Times of Israel said these statements may be motivated by the remaining Iranian Jews trying to prevent being targeted themselves by the regime.

In February 2023, Khamenei's representative to Iran's Markazi Province, Gholamali Dorri-Najafabadi, denied that six million Jews were killed in the Holocaust, claiming that the true figure is around 50 or 60 Jews, and that the Holocaust has been used as a "pretext to fight against Islam, Muslims, and the hijab." Later on, two weeks before the festival of Purim, a woman who met Khamenei alleged that he proclaimed that if Israel attacks Iranian nuclear facilities, Iran would retaliate against Jewish communities in the diaspora. The tombs of Mordechai and Esther were desecrated during the Gaza war. On July 31, 2024 the Tehran Central Jewish committee issued a statement condemning the elimination of Hamas leader Ismail Haniyeh and called for an Iranian response.

== Population and emigration ==
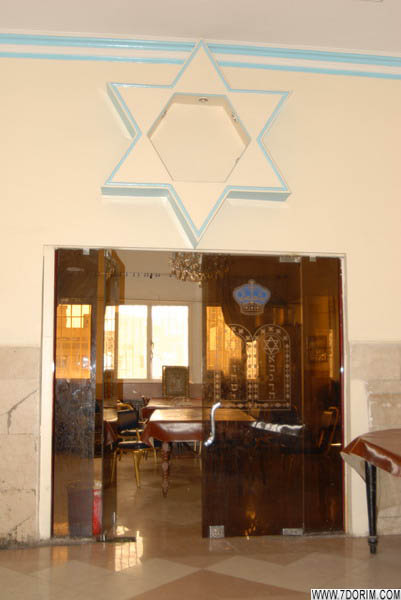
Abrishami Synagogue in Palestine St. (Formerly known as Kakh st.) which was opened in 1965.

Driven by persecutions, thousands of Persian Jews emigrated to Palestine in the late 19th and early 20th century. Many Jews who decided to stay in Iran moved to Tehran to be close to the Shah and enjoy his protection. In 1868, Jews were the most significant minority in Tehran, numbering 1,578 people. By 1884, this figure had risen to 5,571. By 1932, Tehran's Jewish population had risen to 6,568.

From the beginning of the 20th century, the literacy rate among the Jewish minority was significantly higher than the Muslim masses. In 1945, about 80 percent of the Jewish population were literate, whereas most Muslims could not read and write. In 1968, only 30 percent of Muslims were literate, whereas this figure was more than 80 percent for the Jews.

At the time of the establishment of the State of Israel in 1948, there were approximately 140,000–150,000 Jews living in Iran, the historical center of Persian Jewry.

Eliz Sanasarian estimates that in 1948–1953, about one-third of Iranian Jews, most of them poor, emigrated to Israel. David Littman puts the total figure of emigrants to Israel in 1948–1978 at 70,000.

Prior to the Islamic Revolution in 1979, there were 80,000 Jews in Iran, concentrated in Tehran (60,000), Shiraz (8,000), Kermanshah (4,000), Isfahan (3,000). The cities of Khuzistan, as well as Kashan, Tabriz, Hamedan, and Sanandaj had a small Aramaic-speaking Jewish community of about 4,000 people.

About 95% have since migrated, with the immigration accelerating after the 1979 Islamic Revolution, when the population dropped from around 100,000 to about 9,000. Future New York State Senator 13- year-old Anna Kaplan was one of the Jewish Iranians who emigrated; her parents were unable to join her until over two years later.

In the mid- and late 1980s, it was estimated at 20,000–30,000, rising to around 35,000 in the mid-1990s. According to the Iranian census, the Jewish population of Iran was 9,826 in 2016.

As of 2023, the Berman Jewish Databank reports that 9,100 Jews are left in Iran.

As of 2025, there are approximately 100 synagogues in Iran.

== See also ==
- Mountain Jews (the descendants of Jews who migrated from mainland Iran to the Caucasus, mainly Dagestan and Azerbaijan.)
- International Conference to Review the Global Vision of the Holocaust
- Iranian Jews in Israel
- International Holocaust Cartoon Competition
- Iran–Israel relations
- Persian Jews
- History of the Jews under Muslim rule
- Exodus of Iranian Jews
- Jewish exodus from the Muslim world
- Jews of Iran (documentary film)
- Mahmoud Ahmadinejad and Israel
- Mashadi Jewish Community
- Shiraz blood libel
- Allahdad Massacre
- Iran-Israel non-political relations
