= List of chief rabbis of Iran =

The following list of chief rabbis of Iran gives information regarding the Chief Rabbi of the mainstream majority Orthodox Persian Jewish community of Iran. The Chief Rabbi is also the worldwide spiritual leader of Persian Jewry.

== List ==
Term	Name	Image	Note
1922–1980	Yedidia Shofet		Rabbi of Kourosh Synagogue
1980–1994	Uriel Davidi		Rabbi of Darvaz-e Dolat Synagogue
1994–2007	Yosef Hamadani Cohen		Rabbi of Yusef Abad Synagogue
2007–2011	Mashallah Golestani-Nejad		Rabbi of Yusef Abad Synagogue
2011–present	Yehuda Gerami		Rabbi of Yusef Abad Synagogue

== See also ==
- Chief Rabbi
- Persian Jews
- History of the Jews in Iran
