= Asinai =

Asinai may refer to:

- Asinai, an ancient Babylonian-Jewish robber chieftain
- Hasinai, a Native American tribe
