= Yehuda Gerami =

Chief Rabbi of Iran

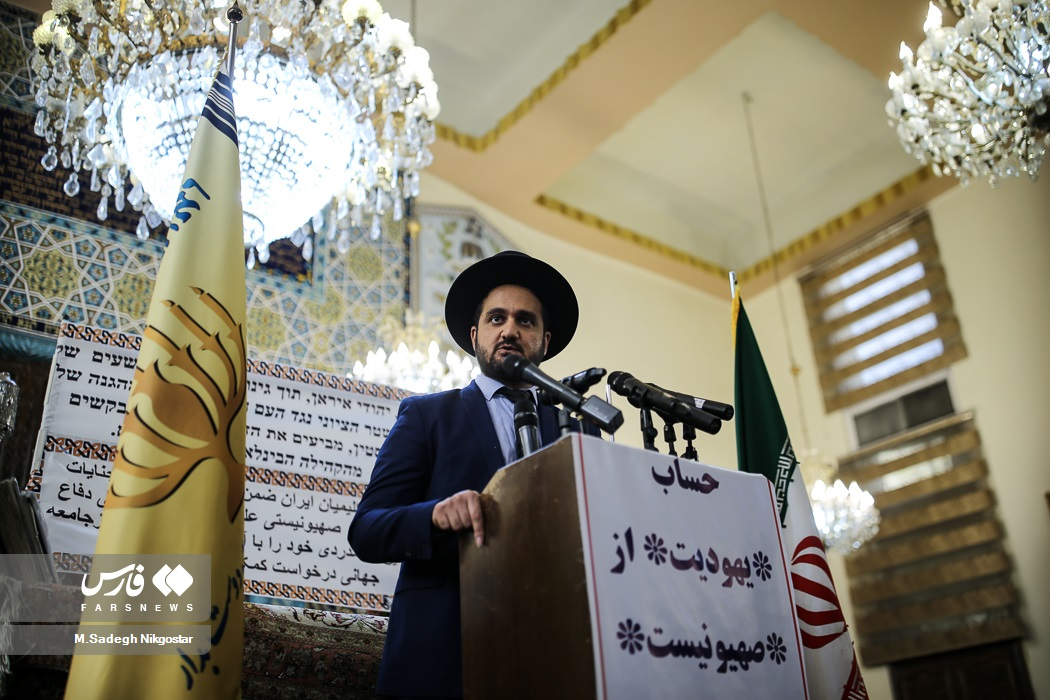
- Yehuda Gerami speaking at an Iranian Anti-Israel rally in Tehran in 2023.

Personal life
- Born: یهودا گرامی; 1983-4 (age 38–39)
- Spouse: Tzipora Gerami

Religious life
- Religion: Judaism

Jewish leader
- Predecessor: Mashallah Golestani-Nejad
- Position: Chief Rabbi of Iran
- Synagogue: Yusef Abad Synagogue

Yehuda Gerami (born 1983 or 1984) is the Chief Rabbi of Iran and spiritual leader for the Jewish community of Iran since 2011.

== Biography ==
Gerami was born in Tehran. His father, Shlomo Gerami, was a surgeon in many hospitals in Tehran including the Dr. Sapir Jewish Hospital. He went to Talmud Torah. At the age of 15, he went from Turkey to Jerusalem to study in Yeshivas Ateres Yisrael, under Rav Boruch Mordechai Ezrachi. He then came back to Iran for a year and then continued his Jewish studies in Yeshivas Ner Israel in Baltimore, Maryland which has a government-sanctioned arrangement with Iran. He continued his studies in the United States until he got his rabbinical ordination under Rav Moshe Heinemann at the age of 25. He then returned to Iran and served as Chief Rabbi. Under this position, he oversees the Jewish community and supervises synagogues, mikvehs and kosher slaughter. In 2021, Gerami took part in the Alliance of Rabbis in Islamic States' first summit in Istanbul, Turkey.

In November 2021, Gerami visited Jewish communities in the United States and met with many Jewish organizations such as Chabad Lubavitch. He was criticized by many American Jewish leaders for his public denunciation of the State of Israel and Zionism, and his visit to Qasem Soleimani's house in the aftermath of Soleimani's death. Speaking to an American audience, Gerami has justified his statements as having been made out of concern for the safety of the Jewish community in Iran.

Yehuda Gerami is close to Chabad lubavitch movement and has visited its headquarters in New York on multpile occasions.In 2021 and during the renovation of Tehran's mikveh, a picture of Lubavitcher Rebbe, Menachem Mendel Schneerson was placed next to Ovadia Yosef by Yehuda Gerami.

== See also ==
- Younes Hamami Lalehzar
- Tehran Jewish Committee

Jewish titles
Preceded by Mashallah Golestani-Nejad	Chief Rabbi of Iran; 2011–	Succeeded by
