= Yusef Abad =

Neighbourhood in Tehran, Iran

Coordinates: 35°10′N 61°06′E

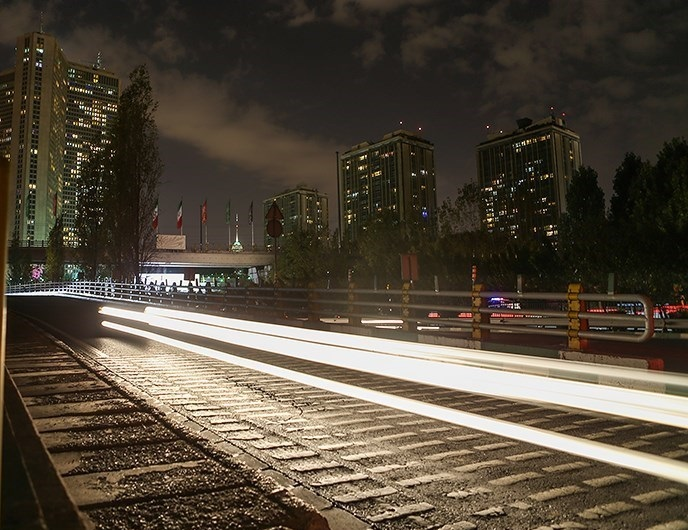
Yusef Abad at night, 2018

Yusef Abad (also transliterated as Yousef Abad, Yusuf Abad, Yusof Abad, Yousuf Abad; Persian: یوسف‌آباد, romanized: Yusef-Ābād, Hebrew: יוסף אבאד) is an old neighbourhood of Tehran, consisting of an area developed through nearly parallel streets including; Sayed Jamaleddin Asad Abadi (usually considered to be the main street of Yusef Abad area), Ibn-e-Sina (Avicena or Poor Sina), Jahan Ara, Mahram (Modabber), and Akbari (Mostowfi). The area was first built by Mirza Yusef Ashtiani Mostowfi ul-Mamalek in north-west of Dar-ol Xelafe Naseri, so was named after his name as Yusef Abad locality.

People residing there are, generally expected to be, of upper middle class, well-off, and prestigious. The area is located in the north-central part of the city and is served by Valiasr Street, as well as Kordestan and Hemmat Expressways.

Three parks are, commonly supposed to be, the most reputable recreation centers in the region; Shafaq park, almost in the middle of the area, wherein Shafaq public library, and the well-known Shafaq or Student Community/Cultural Center are located. Second one is Qezel-Qale (translated as Red Castle) park, which is located at the beginning of Jahan Ara street. This place used to be a part of the former Qezel-Qale prison that has been abandoned for many years. The latter is Dustan (translated as Friends) park, that is situated on the northern part of Yusef Abad.

Yusef Abad has a gas station and a cinema/theater. The Yusef Abad Police Station is located on the corner of Asad Abadi Square (formerly known as Kalantari Square, translated as Police Station Square).

The locality is one of the major neighbourhoods in Tehran with the highest population of Iranian Jews. Others are Oudlajan, Gisha, Sheikh Hadi, and Gorgan.

Yusef Abad is host to a few synagogues, also one of the largest in north of the city, named Yusef Abad Synagogue.

The area is home to some of the first and prominent residential skyscrapers in Tehran, the A.S.P. Towers. The towers are located on the corner of Kordestan and Hakim Highways. These well-built constructions were completed in 1976, and have been landmarks ever since.

Tehran International Tower is also situated just behind the A.S.P. Towers. The skyscraper has the title of the tallest residential tower in Iran.
