= Uriel Davidi =

Iranian rabbi (born 1922)

Rabbi Uriel Davidi
- אוריאל דוידי
- Uriel Davidi

Chief Rabbi of Iran
- In office 1980–1994
- Preceded by: Yedidia Shofet
- Succeeded by: Yosef Hamadani Cohen

Personal details
- Born: אוריאל דוידי; 1922 Khansar, Sublime State of Iran
- Died: December 24, 2006 (aged 83–84) Neve Yaakov, Jerusalem
- Occupation: Chief Rabbi of Iran, Theologian

Hakham Uriel Davidi (Hebrew: אוריאל דוידי; lived 1922 - December 24, 2006) was a famous Jewish (Judæo-Khunsari) religious leader and theologian, who was born in Khansar (Iran) and died in the Neve Yaakov settlement of Jerusalem, where he spent the last 12 years of his life. He was descended from a long line of rabbis who preceded him in leading the Jewish community in Iran.

Born to Hacham Meir Davidi, he continued the tradition of a learned scholar and after moving to Tehran, became a more prominent community leader in his own right. In the late 1970s, Davidi, along with the late chief rabbi, Hacham Yedidia Shofet, made annual visits to the Shah Mohammad Reza Pahlavi, as representatives of the Jewish community. In 1979, shortly after the Islamic revolution, Davidi and Shofet, along with a few other members of the Jewish community of Tehran, met with the new leadership of the Islamic Republic in order to preserve the rights of the Jewish community. Among Persian Jews, he has been known as "Hacham Uriel".

Hacham Uriel Davidi served as the chief rabbi of Iran after Hacham Shofet left, from 1980 to 1994. He gave weekly religious lectures on Saturday afternoons in Tehran's Darvaz-e Dolat Synagogue during this time. He also performed wedding ceremonies and functioned as a 'mohel'. On January 17, 1994, he moved to Jerusalem.

One of his sons is Rabbi Nissim Davidi, the Kashrut Administrator of the Rabbinical Council of California in Los Angeles, California. He is also a certified mohel as his father and paternal grandfather were before him.

His grandson, and namesake, Uriel Davidi is a popular modern singer on the American Chareidi Jewish music scene known as “Uri Davidi”.

== Gallery ==
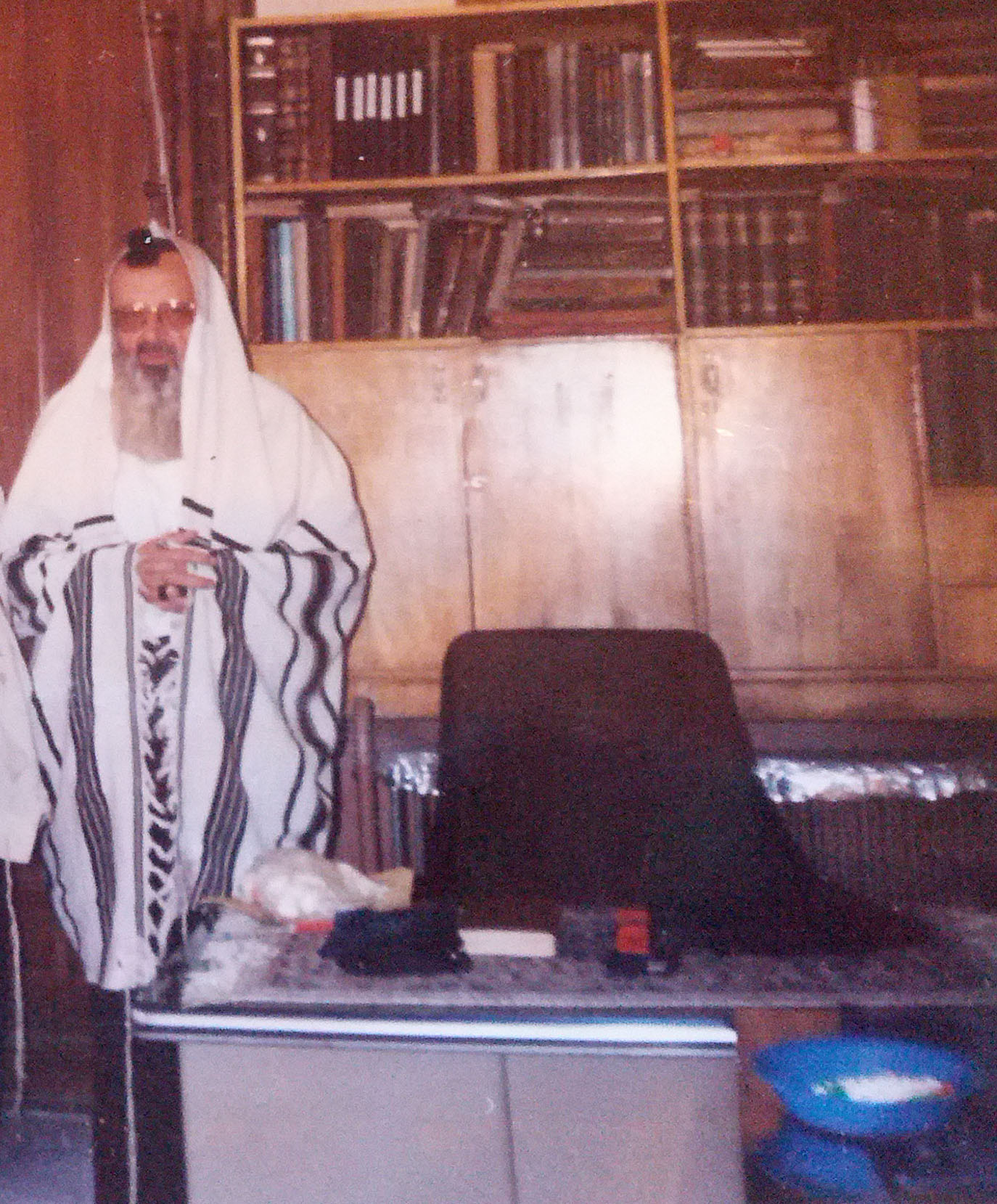
Uriel Davidi Tehran

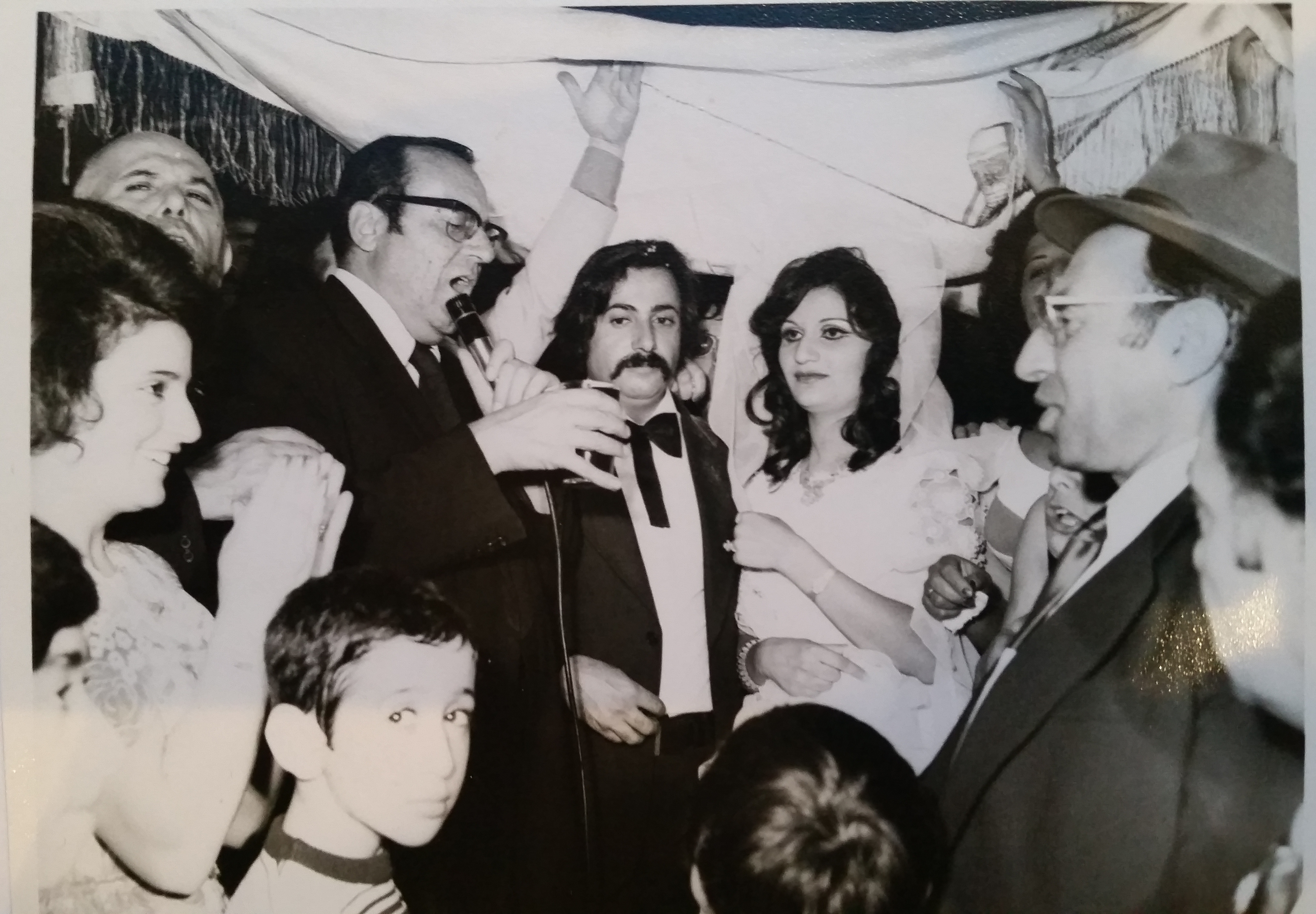
Hakham Uriel officiating a wedding, Tehran, 1975

Jewish titles
Preceded by Yedidia Shofet	Chief Rabbi of Iran; 1980-1994	Succeeded by Yosef Hamadani Cohen
