= Shalom (newspaper) =

Jewish newspaper in Iran

Shalom was the first Jewish newspaper published in Iran. Launched in Iran's capital Tehran in 1915 (then Qajar Iran), it was founded by Mordechai Ben Avraham (1888-1964). Its chief editor was Mordechai's brother, Asher (1890-1963). The first issue was specifically chosen to be published on Nowruz (March 21 1915), the day of the Iranian New Year. The establishment of the newspaper was made possible through the Persian Constitutional Revolution. The newspaper was written in Judeo-Persian.
