= Yosef Hamadani Cohen =

Chief Rabbi of Iran from 1994 to 2007

Chacham Yosef Hamadani Cohen
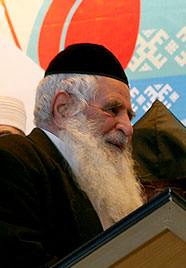

Personal life
- Born: 1916
- Died: March 29, 2014 (aged 97–98) Tehran, Iran

Religious life
- Religion: Judaism

Jewish leader
- Predecessor: Uriel Davidi
- Successor: Younes Hamami Lalehzar
- Position: Chief Rabbi of Iran
- Synagogue: Yusef Abad Synagogue
- Began: 1994
- Ended: 2006

Yusef Hamadani Cohen (Persian: یوسف همدانی کهن ;1916 – 29 March 2014) was the Chief Rabbi of Iran and spiritual leader for the Jewish community of Iran (Iranian Jews) between January 1994 and 2007.

== Career ==
In August 2000, Chief Rabbi Hamadani Cohen met with Iranian President Mohammad Khatami for the first time. In 2003, Cohen and Member of Parliament Morris Motamed met with Khatami at Yusef Abad Synagogue which was the first time a President of Iran had visited a synagogue since the Islamic Revolution. For the event, Cohen led the opening of the Torah scroll ark and the recitation of prayers.

== Death ==
Cohen died after a long illness on 29 March 2014 in Tehran over Shabbat.

Jewish titles
Preceded by Uriel Davidi	Chief Rabbi of Iran; 1994–2007	Succeeded by Mashallah Golestani-Nejad
