= Shmuel Hayyim =

Iranian-Jewish journalist and Zionist

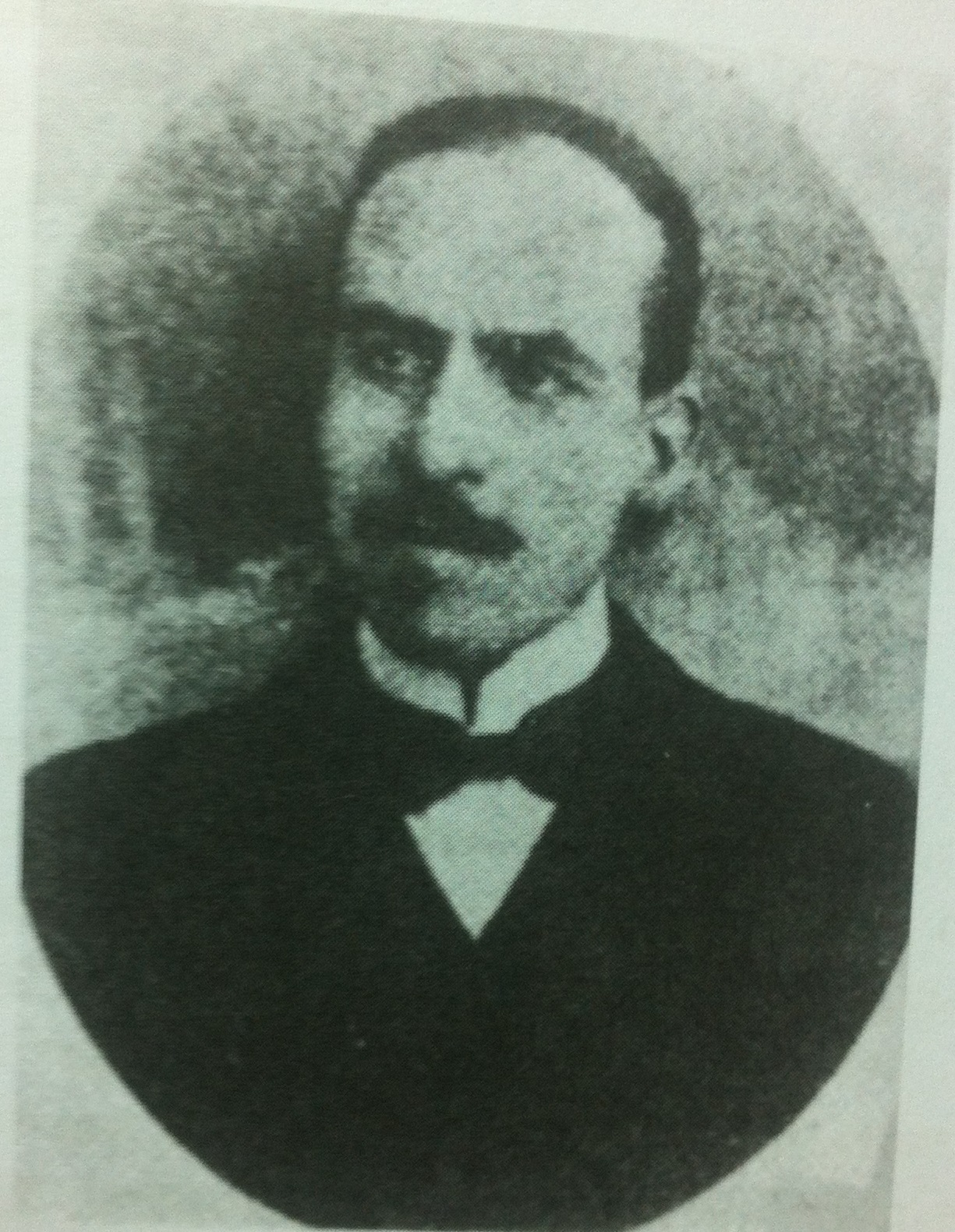
Shmuel Hayyim.

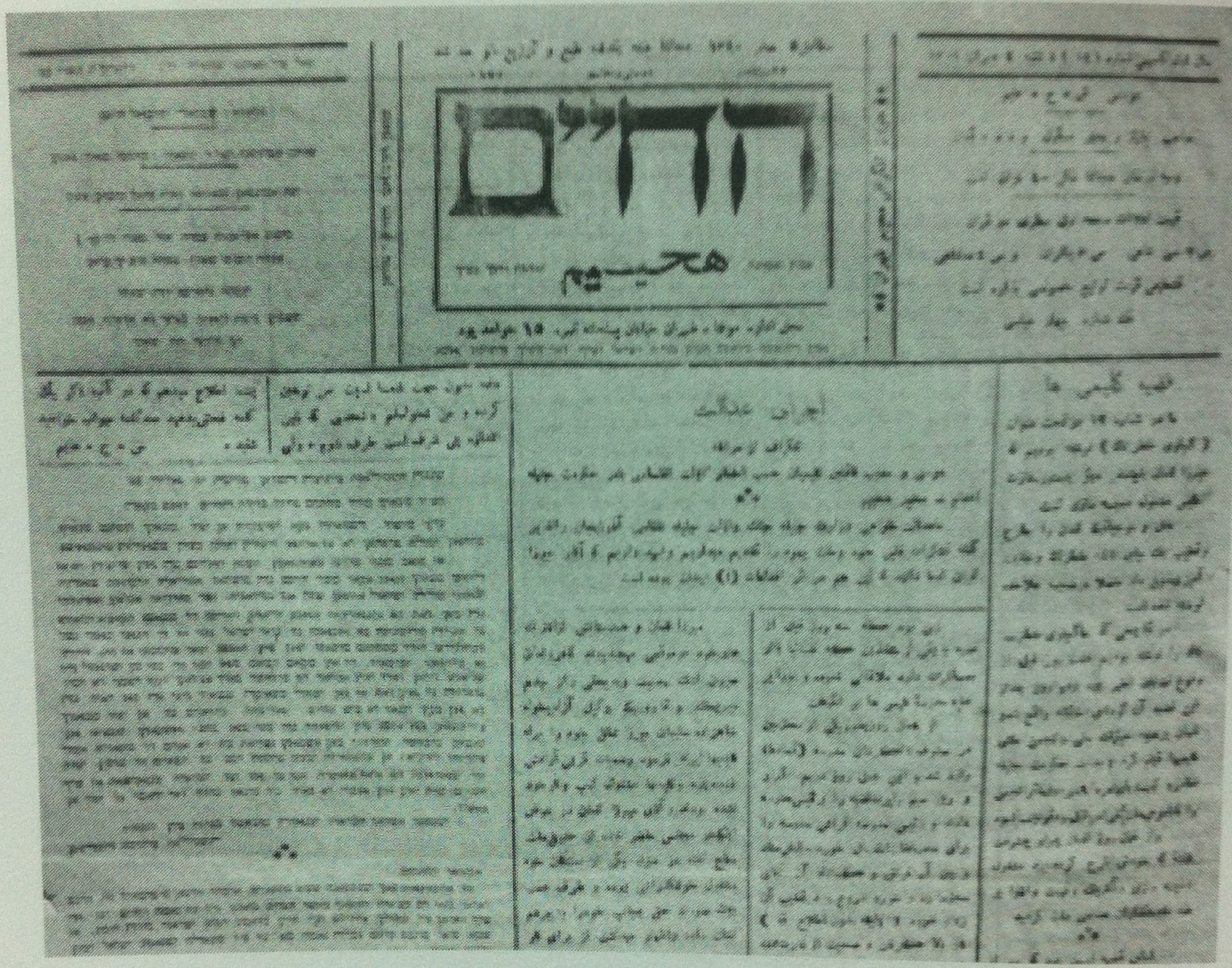
First page of Ha-Hayyim newspaper which was published between 1922 and 1925.

Shmuel Hayyim (HE: שמואל חיים) (1931–1891), also known as Shmuel Eshagh Effendi or Monsieur Hayyim, was a Persian Jewish journalist, leader of the Iranian Jewish community, a Zionist, and a member of the Majlis (Iranian Parliament).

== Biography ==
Hayyim was born in Kermanshah. He studied in the Alliance Israelite Universelle schools in Kermanshah and learned foreign languages. He was employed in the customs from 1914 and made good connections with the British embassy in Iran. He came to Tehran in 1920 and started working as a Journalist. He decided to start publishing a newspaper for the Iranian Jews called Ha-Hayyim. This newspaper was published between 1922 and 1925. Most of the newspaper was in Persian, but there were some Hebrew articles as well.

Hayyim used the political power of his newspaper to encourage Jewish Iranians to fight politically. He wrote inflammatory articles criticizing the Iranian government for not giving Jews enough protection and not abolishing religious laws against Jews. Hayyim contacted the League of Nations and asked for help for Iranian Jewry. He also used the newspaper to spread Zionism among Iranian Jews. These actions made many enemies for him inside and outside the government.

He became a candidate for Iranian parliament in 1923 and won with a landslide victory. However, Reza Khan did not like his political ambitions and he was arrested before the sixth parliament elections. His arrest led to his losing the election to Ayoub Loghman Nehourai. Subsequently, he was charged with conspiracy to murder the Shah and attempting to overthrow the monarchy in favor of a republic - charges that were never substantiated, and later proven to have been instigated by his political rivals. He was tried in a military tribunal and condemned to death. He was held in prison for six years, and abruptly executed by firing squad in 1931.
