= Yusef Abad Synagogue =

Orthodox synagogue in Tehran, Iran

- Hebrew: בית הכנסת יוסף אבאד; Persian: کنیسه یوسف آباد
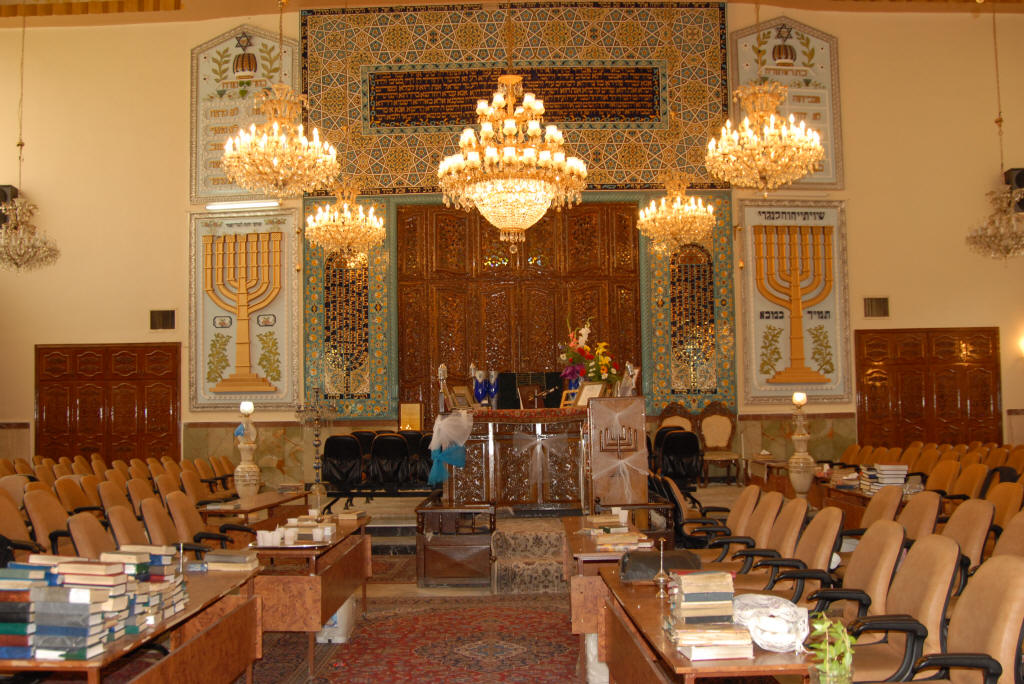
- The synagogue interior in 2005

- Location of the synagogue in Tehran

Religion
- Affiliation: Orthodox Judaism
- Ecclesiastical or organisational status: Synagogue
- Status: Active

Location
- Location: 15th St., Sayyed Jamáleddin e Asadábádi Ave, Yusef Abad, Tehran
- Country: Iran
- Coordinates: 35°43′39″N 51°24′33″E

Architecture
- Type: Synagogue architecture
- Style: Persian
- Funded by: Ibrahim Yosiyan
- Established: c. 1950 (as a congregation)
- Completed: 1965

Specifications
- Capacity: 900 worshippers
- Interior area: 1,076 m^{2} (11,580 sq ft)
- Materials: Brick; tiles; timber

The Yusef Abad Synagogue (Persian: کنیسه یوسف آباد, romanized: Kanise-ye Yusef Ābād; Hebrew: בית הכנסת יוסף אבאד), officially Sukkat Shalom Synagogue (Hebrew: סֻכַּת שָׁלוֹם, lit. 'Tent of Peace'), is an Orthodox Jewish congregation and synagogue, located at the junction of 15th Street and Sayyed Jamáleddin e Asadábádi Ave, in the Yusef Abad neighborhood of Tehran, in Iran.

It is the main synagogue of Tehran, and it is also one of the largest synagogues in the city.

== History ==
The original building that housed the synagogue was completed in the early 1950s. With the growth of the Jewish population of the capital especially in the Yusef Abad neighborhood, it was decided that a newer building was needed. With the help of local community leaders headed by Avraham Yusian, the construction of the new facade was completed in October 1965. The doors of the new synagogue were opened to the public on Rosh Hashanah 5726 (Hebrew calendar).

Predominately Persian in style, the synagogue is well known for its tile mosaics, in blue, white and black, and traces of green, yellow, and beige.

On 8 February 2003, President Mohammad Khatami visited Yusef Abad Synagogue becoming the first President of Iran to visit a synagogue since the 1979 Iranian Revolution. Chief Rabbi Yousef Hamadani Cohen, Haroun Yashayaei, and Morris Motamed attended and represented the Jewish community of Iran. For the event, Chief Rabbi Cohen led the opening the Torah scroll ark and the reciting of prayers.

== Gallery ==
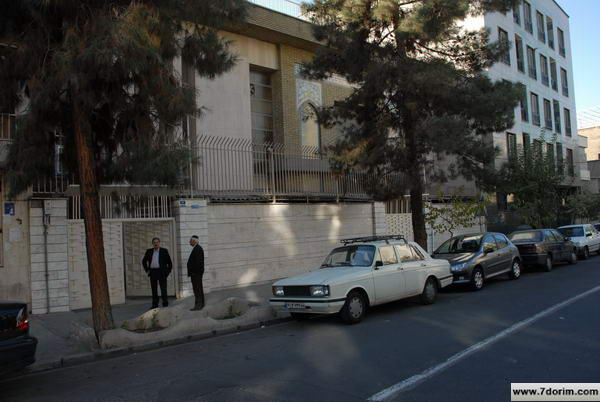

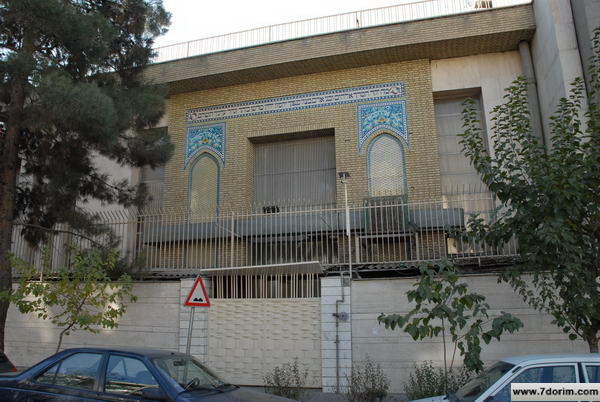

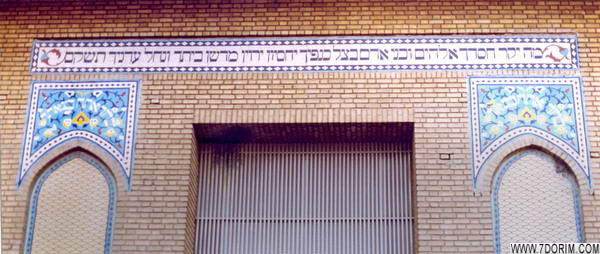

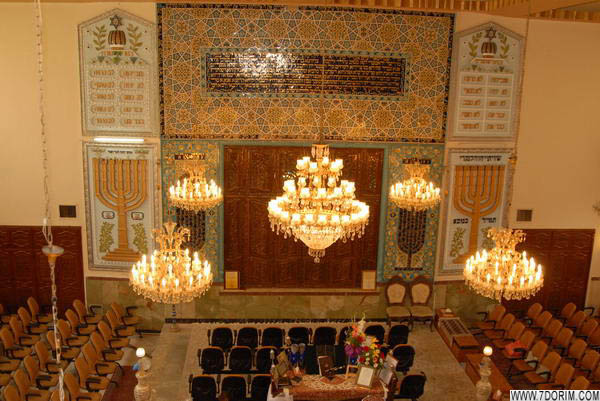

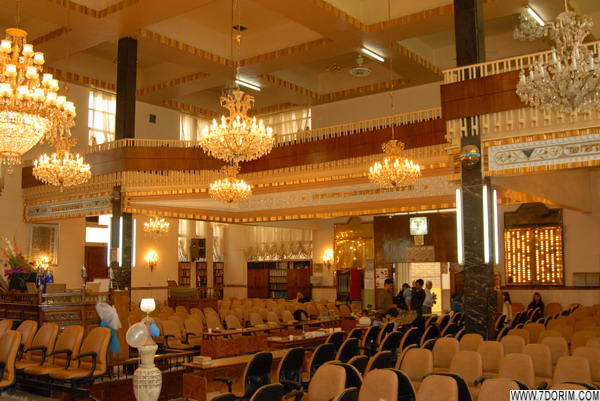

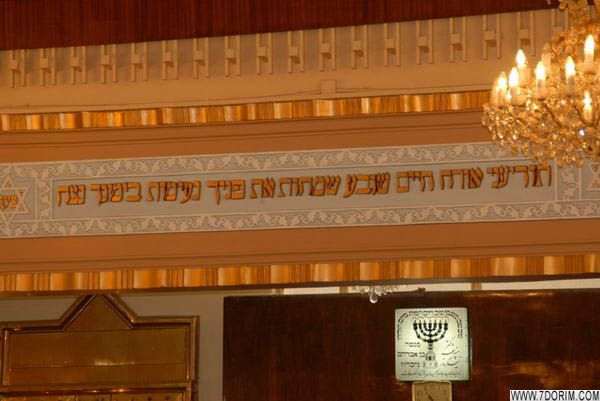

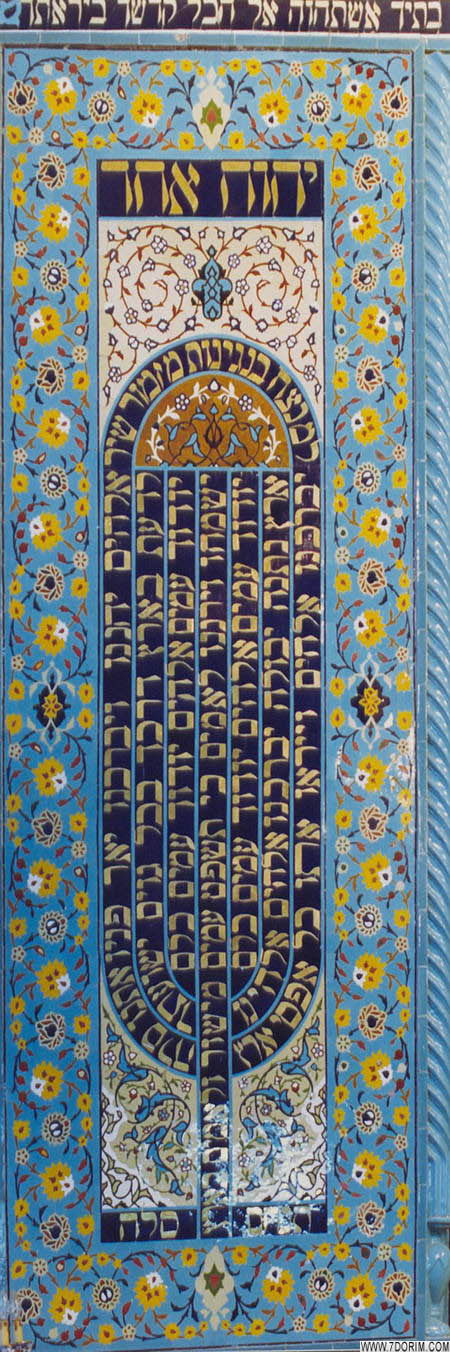

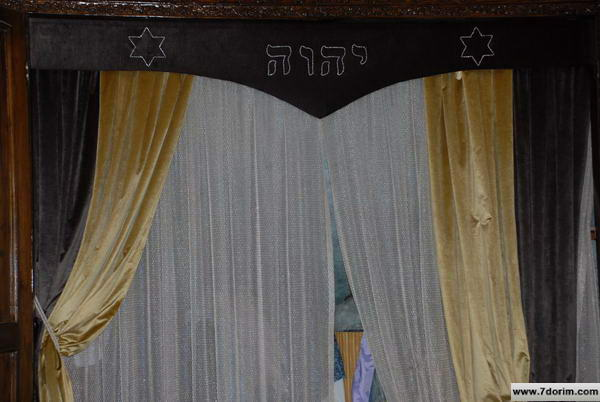

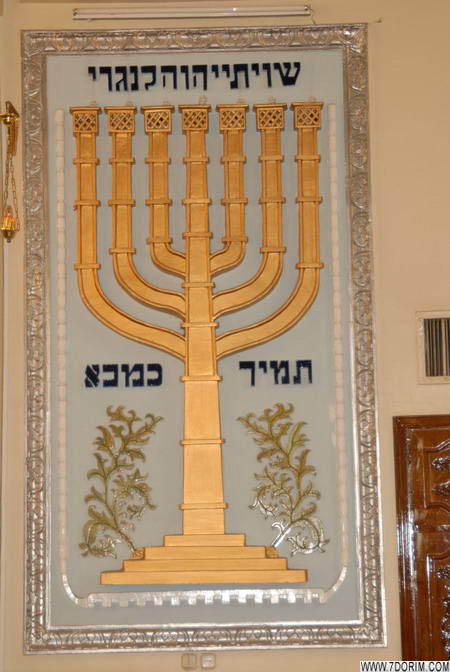

== See also ==
- History of the Jews in Iran
- List of synagogues in Iran
