= Anilai and Asinai =

1st century Babylonian Jewish chieftains

Anilai and Asinai (Jewish Babylonian Aramaic: חֲנִילַאי וְחֲסִינַאי, lit. 'Ḥanilai and Ḥasinai') were two Babylonian-Jewish brothers and robber-chieftains of the Parthian Empire whose exploits were reported by the early Jewish historian Josephus in his Antiquities of the Jews.

They were apprenticed by their widowed mother to a weaver. Having been punished for laziness by their master, they ran away and became freebooters in the marshlands of the Euphrates River. There they gathered about them a large number of discontented Jews, organizing troops, and levying forced contributions on the shepherds, and finally established a little robber-state at the forks of the Euphrates.

On one Shabbat, they were unexpectedly attacked by the Parthian governor of Babylonia. Nevertheless, they resolved to defend themselves regardless of the day of rest and succeeded in defeating their assailant so decisively that Parthian king Artabanus III (10–40 CE), who was preoccupied with suppressing a rebellion at the time, decided to utilize such courageous Jews to maintain control over the satraps. Consequently, he formed an alliance with them, assigning them authority over the portion of Babylonia they had already occupied.

They then built fortifications, and the little state lasted for fifteen years (c. 18–33 CE). Its downfall was brought about by the marriage of Anilai with the widow of a Parthian general, whom he had attacked and killed in battle. He tolerated the religion of his foreign wife, and met the religious intolerance of his people with rigor, thus estranging some of his followers and sowing dissension among them.

After she poisoned Asinai for his intolerant utterances, Anilai assumed the leadership of his troops. He sought to divert them with wars, and succeeded in capturing Mithridates, governor of Parthyene, and son-in-law of the king. He soon, however, released Mithridates, fearing that Artaban might take vengeance on the Babylonian Jews for his death. Being signally defeated by Mithridates in a subsequent engagement, he was forced to withdraw to the forests, where he lived by plundering the Babylonian villages about Nehardea, until his resources were exhausted and the little robber-state disappeared. The Babylonians' discontent with the Jews, restrained because of their fear of Anilai, now broke forth afresh, causing the Jews to flee from persecution to Seleucia, but did not find peace in exile.

The name Anilai is identical with "Ḥanilai" in Talmudic literature. This was, for example, the name of the father of the well-known haggadist Tanḥum b. Ḥamilas (Bacher, Ag. Pal. Amor. iii.627).

== Sources ==
- Josephus, Antiquities, xviii.9.
