= List of religious centers in Tehran =

This is a list of religious centers in Tehran, Iran.

== Shrines and imamzadehs ==
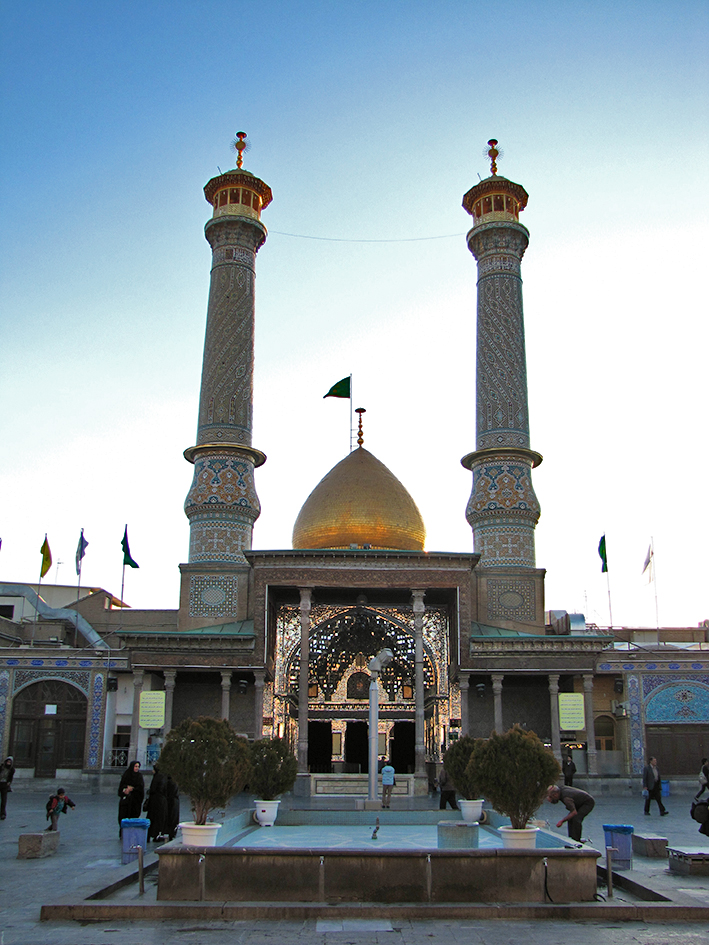
Shah Abdol-Azim Shrine

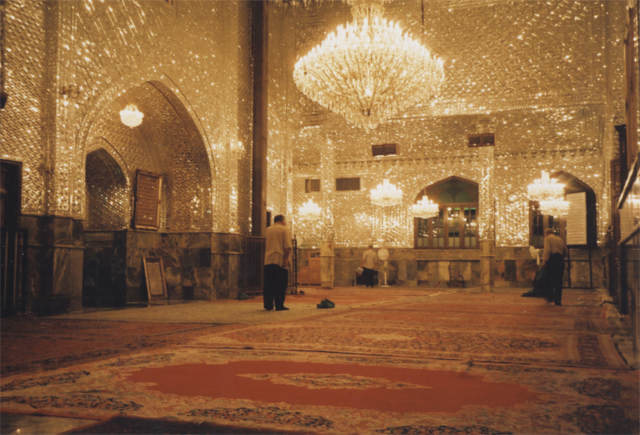
Imamzadeh Saleh, Shemiran

- Shah Abdol-Azim Shrine, Imamzadeh Hamzeh (fa) and Reza Shah's Mausoleum (demolished) – Rey
- Bibi Shahrbanu Shrine – Rey
- Imamzadeh Abdollah shrine and cemetery – Rey
- Imamzadeh Yahya (fa) – Owdelajan
- Imamzadeh Seyed Nasreddin (fa) – Khayyam St.
- Imamzadeh Seyed Esmail (fa) – Tehran Grand Bazaar
- Imamzadeh Zeid (fa) – Tehran Grand Bazaar
- Imamzadeh Seyed Vali (fa) – Tehran Grand Bazaar
- Imamzadeh Seyed Eshaq (fa) – Naser Khosrow St.
- Imamzadeh Qassem (fa) – Tajrish
- Imamzadeh Saleh – Tajrish
- Imamzadeh Esmail – Zargandeh (fa)
- Imamzadeh Esmail (fa) – Chizar (fa)
- Imamzadeh Ali-Akbar (fa) – Chizar
- Imamzadeh Hassan (fa) – Qazvin Rd.
- Imamzadeh Masoum (fa) – Qazvin Rd.
- Imamzadeh Qazi al-Saber (fa) – Vanak
- Imamzadeh Mohammad-Vali (fa) – Darakeh
- Imamzadeh Saleh (fa) – Farahzad
- Imamzadeh Panj-Tan (fa) – Lavizan
- Imamzadeh Esmail (fa) – Lavasan
- Imamzadeh Hadi – Rey
- Imamzadeh Abolhassan (fa) – Rey
- Imamzadeh Bibi Zobeideh (fa) – Rey
- Imamzadeh Zeid (fa) – Vasafnard
- Imamzadeh Davood – Imamzadeh Davood

== Mosques and madrasehs ==
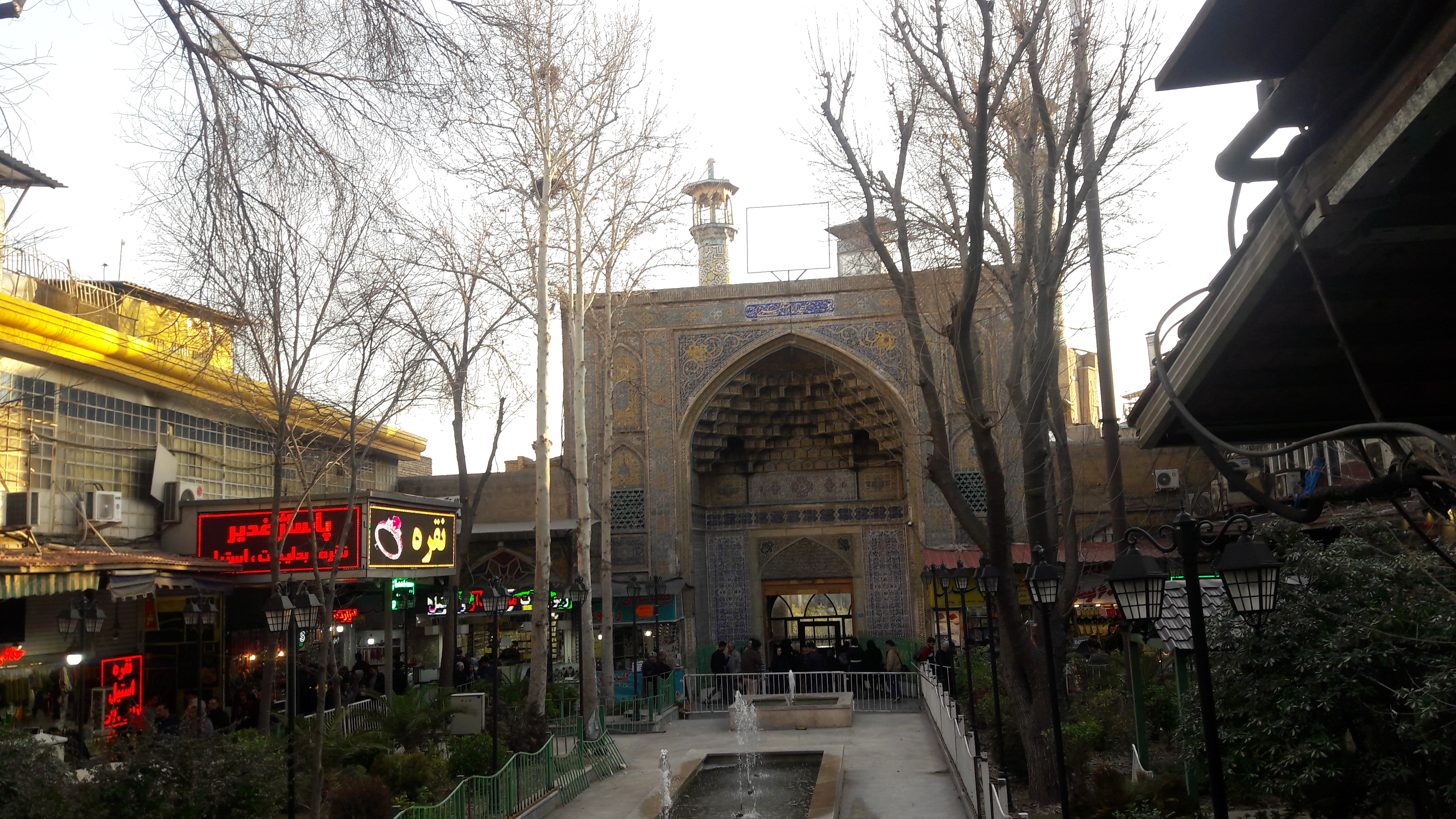
Jameh Mosque of Tehran

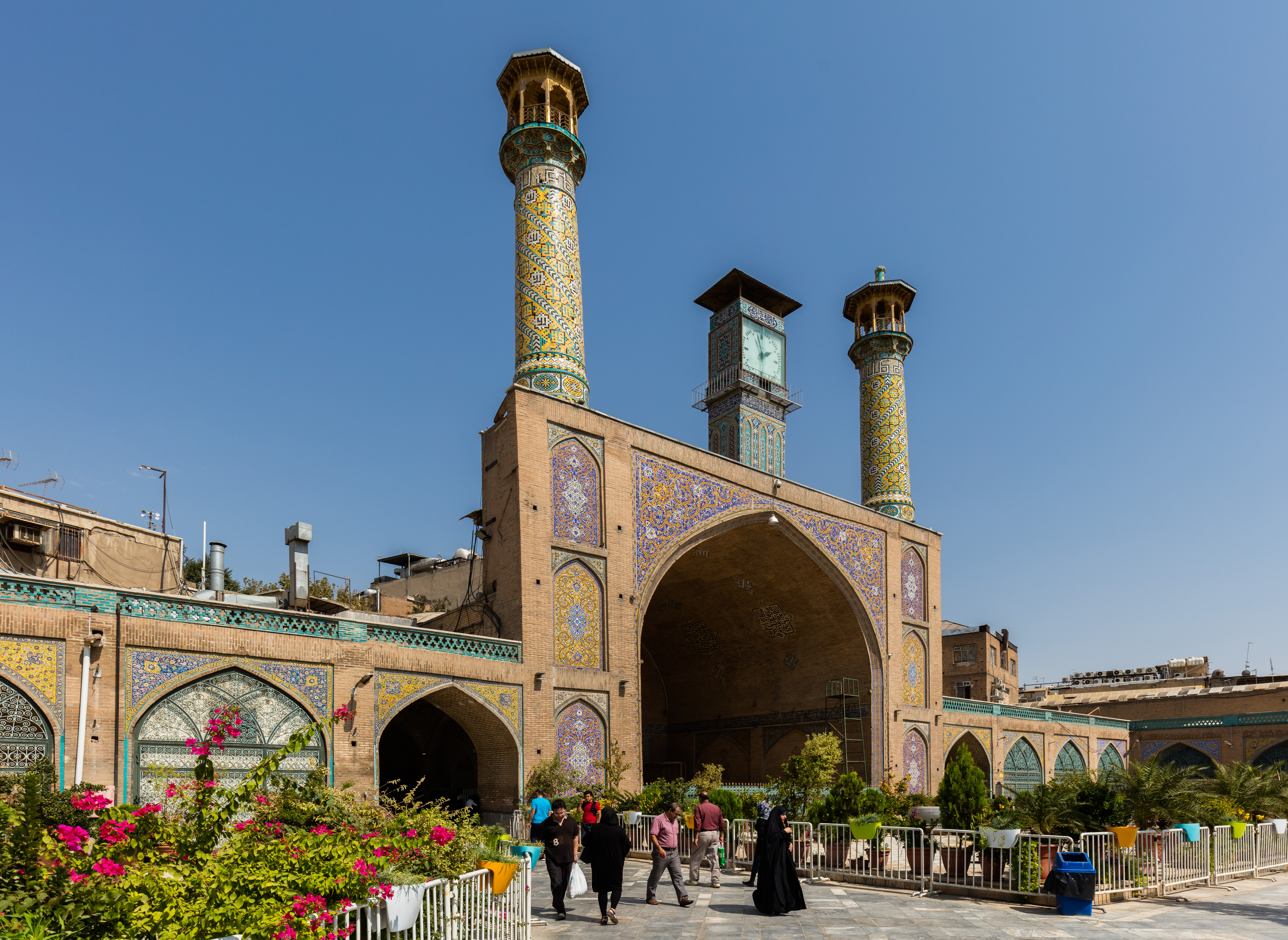
Shah Mosque

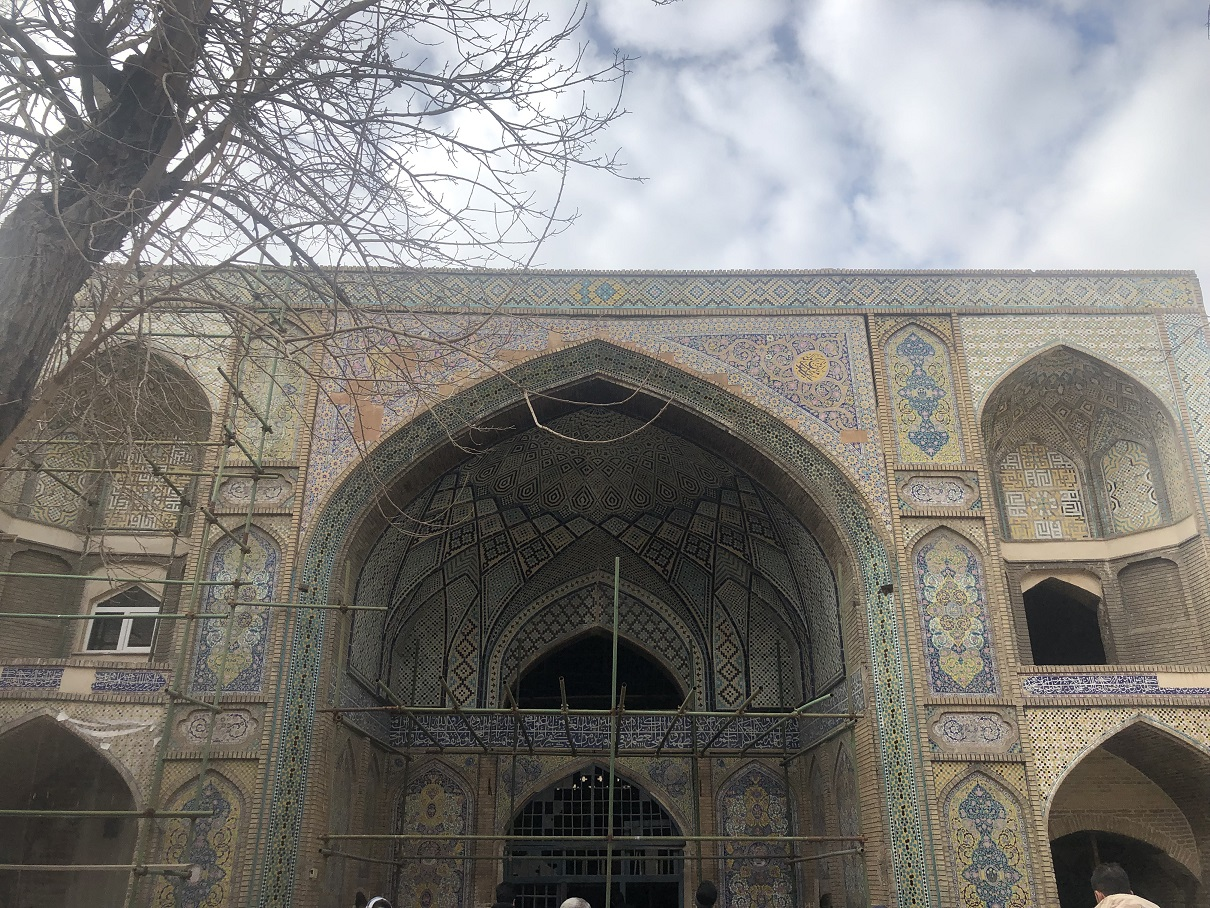
Haj Rajab-Ali Mosque

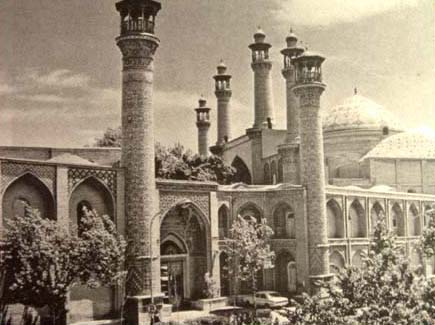
Sepahsalar Mosque Tehran in 1960s

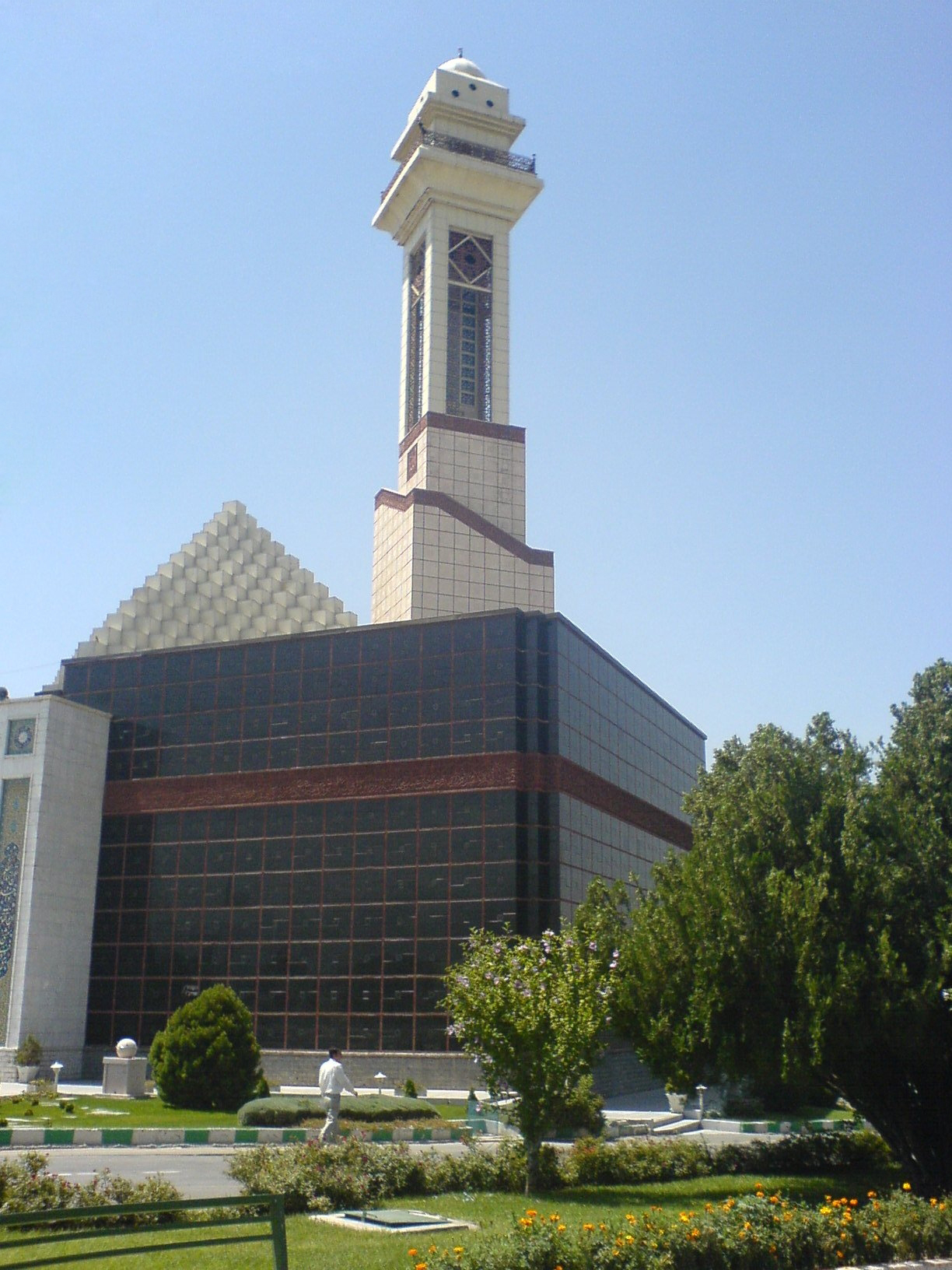
A mosque at the Tehran International Permanent Fairground

- Old Jame Mosque – Tehran Grand Bazaar – 1662 (1072 AH)
- Mohammadieh Madraseh (fa) – Tehran Grand Bazaar – 18th century
- Haj Rajab-Ali Mosque (fa) – Buzarjomehri St. – 1800 (1215 AH)
- Shah Mosque – Tehran Grand Bazaar – 1810–1825 (1225–1240 AH)
- Khan-e Marvi Madraseh (fa) – Marvi St. – 1816 (1231 AH)
- Haj Seyed Azizollah Mosque (fa) – Tehran Grand Bazaar – Early 19th century
- Malek Mosque – Tehran Grand Bazaar – Early 19th century
- Aqa Mahmoud Mosque (fa) – Marvi St. – 1828 (1243 AH)
- Beinol-Haramein Mosque – Tehran Grand Bazaar – 1835 (1251 AH)
- Chalanchi Khan Mosque – Tehran Grand Bazaar – 1837 (1253 AH)
- Kharaqaniha Mosque – Rey St. – Mid-19th century
- Sanee od-Dowleh Mosque – Tehran Grand Bazaar – Mid-19th century
- Memarbashi Mosque and Madraseh (fa) – Emamzadeh Yahya – Mid-19th century
- Sheikh Abdolhussein Mosque and Madraseh (fa) – Pachenar – 1854 (1270 AH)
- Old Sepahsalar Mosque and Madraseh (fa) – Marvi St. – 1861 (1277 AH)
- Abdollah Khan Madraseh – Tehran Grand Bazaar – 1861 (1277 AH)
- Asefieh Madraseh – Tehran Grand Bazaar – 1861 (1277 AH)
- Aqa Mosque – Buzarjomehri St. – 1863 (1280 AH)
- Moayyer ol-Mamalek Mosque and Madraseh (fa) – Khayyam Ave. – 1867 (1284 AH)
- Haj Qanbar-Ali Khan Mosque and Madraseh (fa) – Cyrus Ave. – 1871 (1288 AH)
- Khazen ol-Molk Mosque and Madraseh (fa) – Tehran Grand Bazaar – 1876 (1293 AH)
- Pamenar/Agha Bahram Mosque (fa) – Pamenar St. (fa) – 19th century
- Amin od-Dowleh Mosque – Tehran Grand Bazaar – 19th century
- Aqsa Mosque and Madraseh – Mowlavi Ave. – 19th century
- Aqa Jalal Mosque – Rey St. – 19th century
- Haj Seif od-Dowleh – Zahir-ul-Eslam St. – 19th century
- Dabbaghkhaneh Mosque – Buzarjomehri St. – 19th century
- Saheb-Jam Mosque – Saheb-Jam St. – 19th century
- Majd od-Dowleh Mosque (fa) – Sepah St. – 19th century
- Niaki Mosque – Pamenar St. – 19th century
- Haft-Tan Mosque – Tehran Grand Bazaar – 19th century
- Haft-Dokhtaran Mosque – Tehran Grand Bazaar – 19th century
- Chaharsuq Bozorg Mosque – Tehran Grand Bazaar – 19th century
- Chaharsuq Kuchak Mosque – Tehran Grand Bazaar – 19th century
- Nezam od-Dowleh Mosque (fa) – Naser Khosrow St. – 19th century
- Mirza Mousa Mosque (fa) – Tehran Grand Bazaar – 19th century
- Philsuf od-Dowleh Madraseh (fa) – Tehran Grand Bazaar – 19th century
- Dangi Madraseh – Pamenar St. – 19th century
- New Sepahsalar Mosque and Madraseh – Baharestan Sq. – 1879–1892 (1296–1309 AH)
- Kazemieh Madraseh – Emamzadeh Yahya – 1881 (1298 AH)
- Saheb-Divan Mosque – Tehran Grand Bazaar – 1885 (1302 AH)
- Seraj ol-Mulk Mosque – Amir-Kabir Ave. – 1886 (1303 AH)
- Saneeieh Madraseh – Emamzadeh Yahya – 1886 (1303 AH)
- Haj Abolfath Mosque and Madraseh – Rey St. – 1888–1894 (1305–1312 AH)
- Behbahani Mosque – Buzarjomehri St. – 1893 (1311 AH)
- Haj Esmail Mosque – Shah Sq. – 1896 (1314 AH)
- Moezz od-Dowleh Mosque (fa) – Iran St. – 1899 (1317 AH)
- Moshir os-Saltaneh Mosque and Madraseh (fa) – Mowlavi Ave. – 1900 (1318 AH)
- Hemmatabad Mosque – Sepah Ave. – 1906 (1324 AH)
- Qandi Mosque (fa) – Khaniabad – 1908 (1327 AH)
- Sanee-Divan Mosque – Shahpur Ave. – 1915 (1333 AH)
- Hedayat Mosque – Istanbul Ave. – Early 20th century
- Haj Saqabashi Mosque – Iran St. – Early 20th century
- Monirieh Mosque – Qazvin Ave. – Early 20th century
- Salman Mosque (fa) – Shahbaz Ave. – Early 20th century
- Firouzabadi Mosque (fa) – Rey – Early 20th century
- Lorzadeh Mosque – 1940s
- Fakhr-od-dowleh Mosque – Fakhrabad – 1945
- Sajjad Mosque (fa) – Fakhr-e Razi St. – 1947
- Arg Mosque (ru) – Arg Square – 1949
- Qoba Mosque – Old Shemiran Rd. – 20th century
- Abouzar Mosque (fa) – Fallah – 20th century
- Mojtahedi Madraseh (fa) – Tehran Grand Bazaar – 1956
- Tehran University Mosque (fa) – Tehran University – 1966
- Al-Javad Mosque – 20th century
- Khomeini Madraseh (fa) – Ozgol – 2003
- Grand Mosalla mosque of Tehran

== Hosseiniehs and tekyeh ==
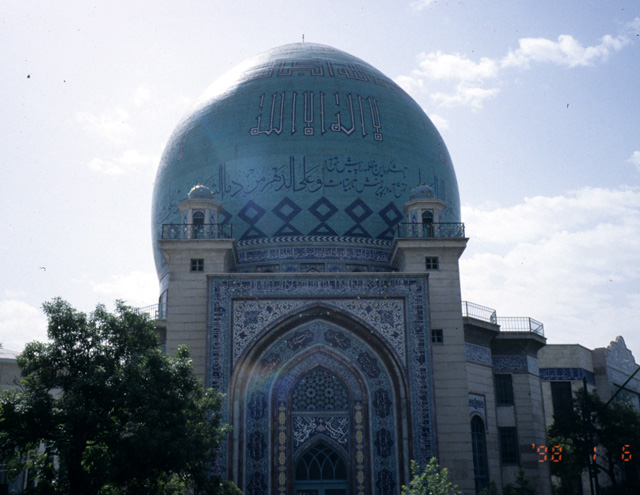
Hosseinieh Ershad

- Takyeh Dowlat – Golestan Palace (demolished)
- Tajrish Tekyeh (fa) – Tajrish
- Aqa Seyed Hashem (fa) – Naderi Ave.
- Dezashib Hosseineh (fa) – Dezashib (fa)
- Niavaran Tekyeh (fa) – Niavaran
- Nafarabad Tekyeh (fa) – Rey
- Hosseiniyeh Ershad – Old Shemiran Rd.
- Jamaran Hussainiya – Jamaran

== Fire temples ==
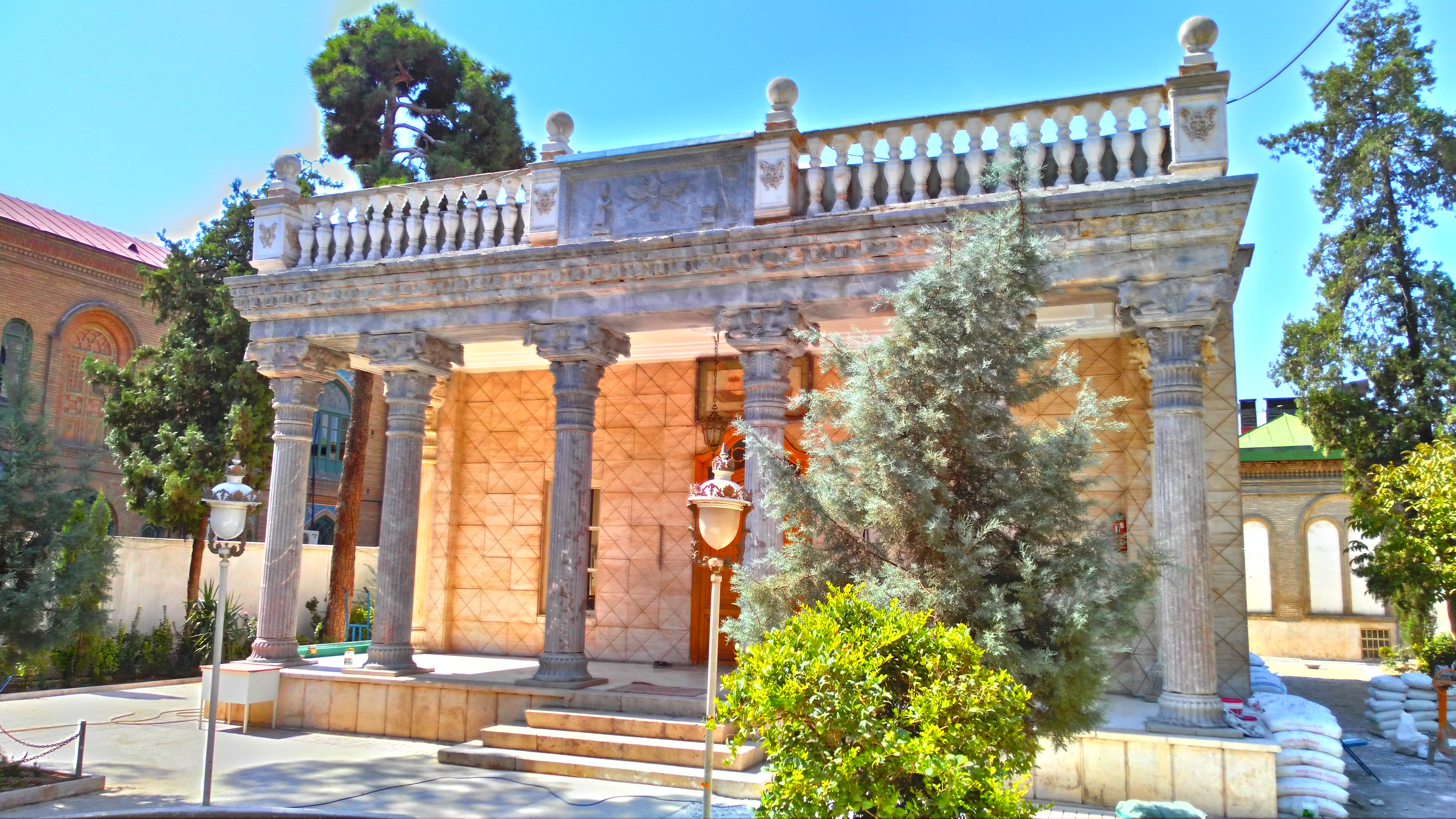
Adrian Fire temple in Tehran

- Fire Temple of Bahram – Rey – before Islam
- Adrian Temple – Qavam St. – 1907
- Markar Complex – TehranPars – 1930s
- Shah Vrahram Izad – South Karegar St.
- Kushk-e Varjavand (fa) – Karaj Rd.
- Great Adorian – Vanak – Under Construction
- Tower of Silence (Dakhmeh-ye Gabrha) (fa) – Located on Moshirieh Rd. (fa) behind 7th unit of Tehran Cement Plant. It is circular in shape.
- Qasr-e-Firuzeh (fa) Zoroastrian Cemetery – 1935

== Baha'i house of worship ==
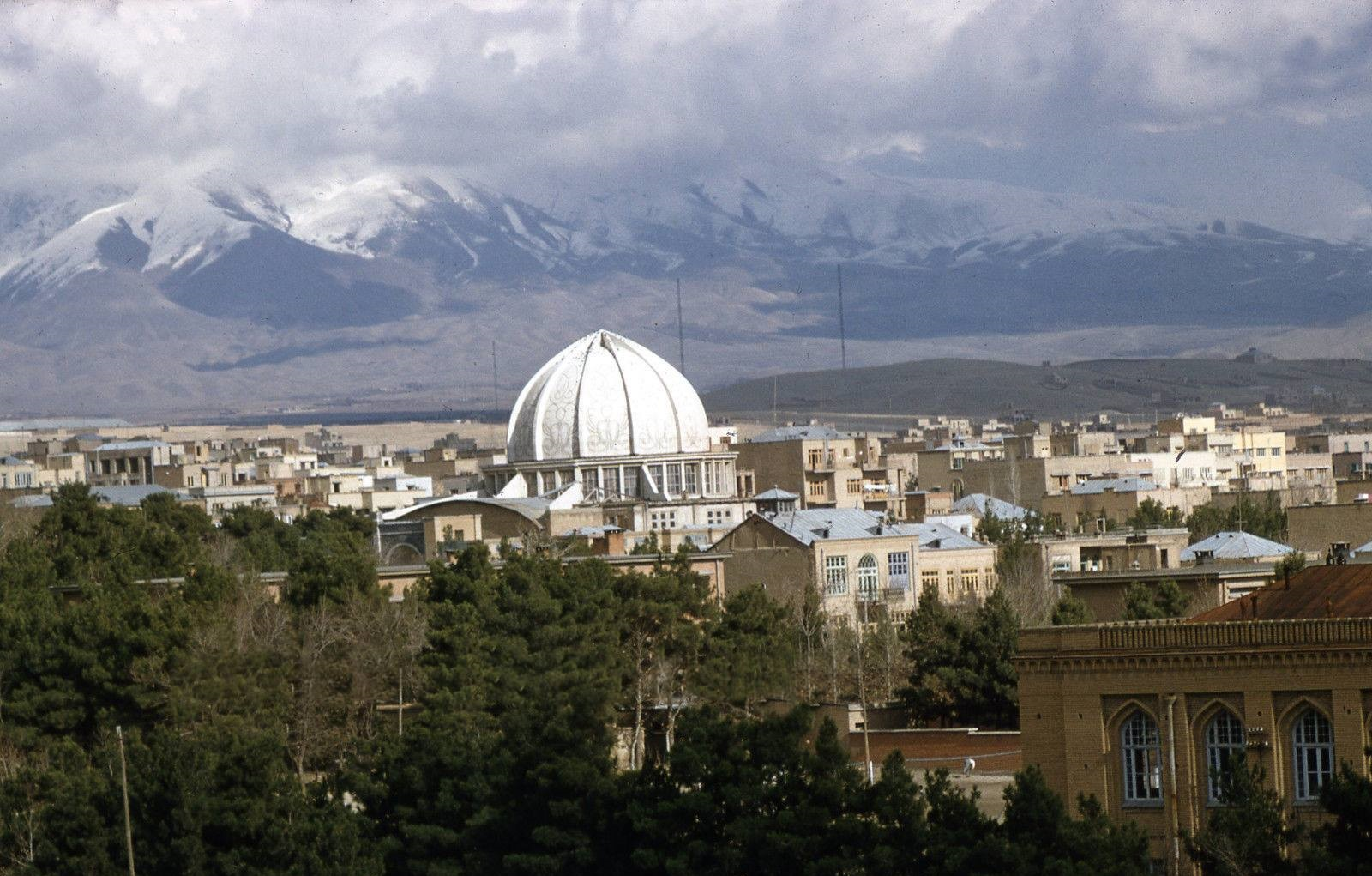
Hazirat ol-Qods in 1955 before demolition of its dome

- Hazirat ol-Qods (changed to a cultural center) (fa) – Hafez Ave.
- Proposed House of Worship

== Churches ==
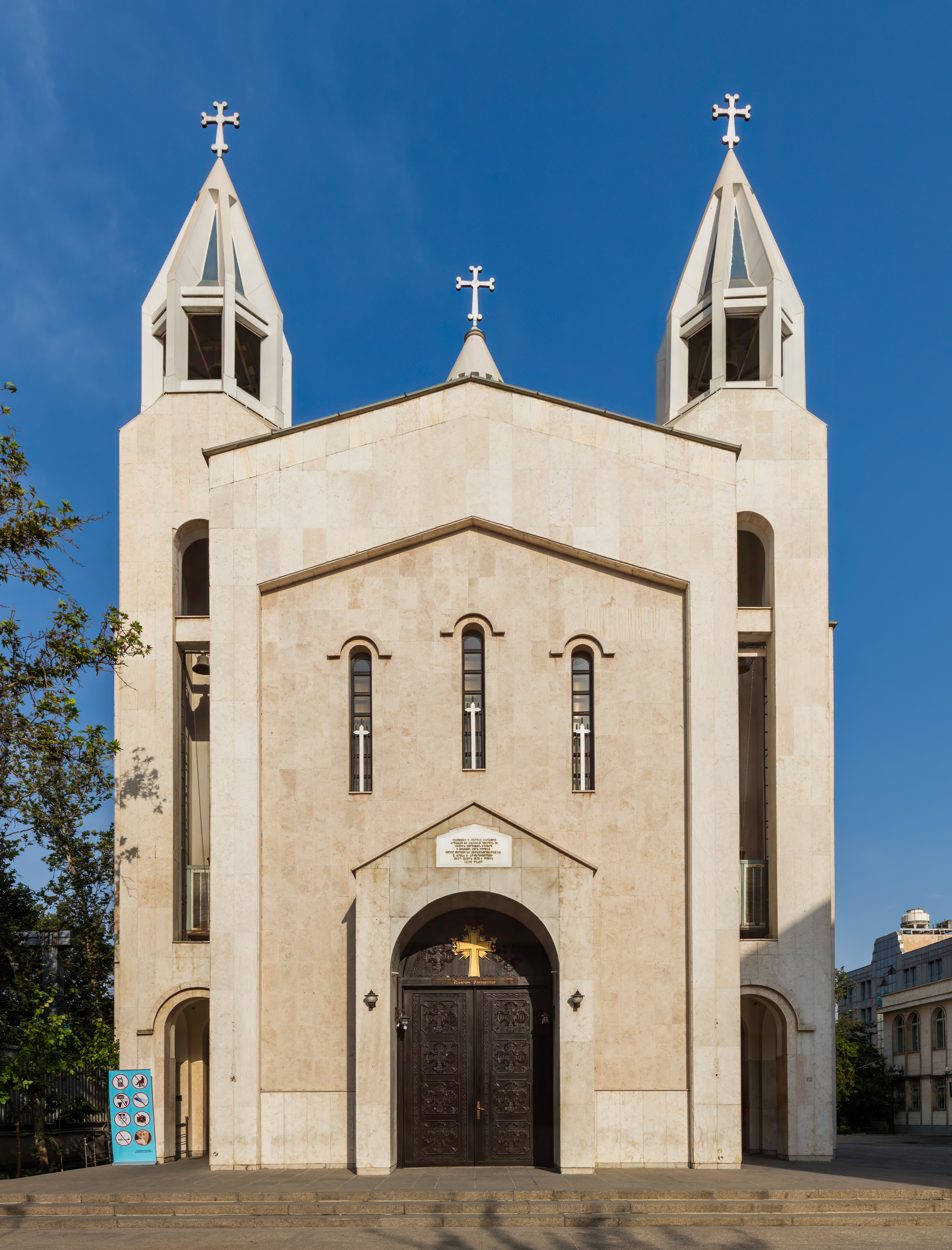
Saint Sarkis Armenian Cathedral in Tehran

=== Eastern Christian churches ===
==== Armenian Apostolic ====
- St. Sarkis Cathedral (Սուրբ Սարգիս մայր տաճար) and Prelacy – KarimKhan Blvd. (fa) – 1970
- Saint George Church (Սուրբ Գևորգ եկեղեցի) (hy) – Shahpur Ave. (fa) – 1795
- Sts. Thaddeus-Bartholomew Church (Սուրբ Թադևոս-Բարդուղիմեոս եկեղեցի) – Tehran Grand Bazaar – 1768
- Saint Minas Church (Սուրբ Մինաս եկեղեցի) (hy) – Vanak – 1854
- Holy Mary Church (Սուրբ Աստվածածին եկեղեցի) – Qavam St. (fa) – 1945
- Holy Translators Church (Սուրբ Թարգմանչաց եկեղեցի) (hy) – Vahidieh – 1868
- Saint Gregory the Illuminator Church (Սուրբ Գրիգոր Լուսավորիչ եկեղեցի) (hy) – Majidieh (fa) – 1982
- Saint Vardan Church (Սրբոց Վարդանանց եկեղեցի) – Heshmatieh – 1986
- Saint John Chapel (Սուրբ Յովհաննէս մատուռ) – Doulab Armenian Cemetery – 1936
- Saint Stephen Chapel (Սուրբ Ստեփանոս մատուռ) (hy) – Nor Burastan Armenian Cemetery – 1974
- Holy Cross Chapel (Սուրբ Խաչ մատուռ) – Ararat Stadium – 1987

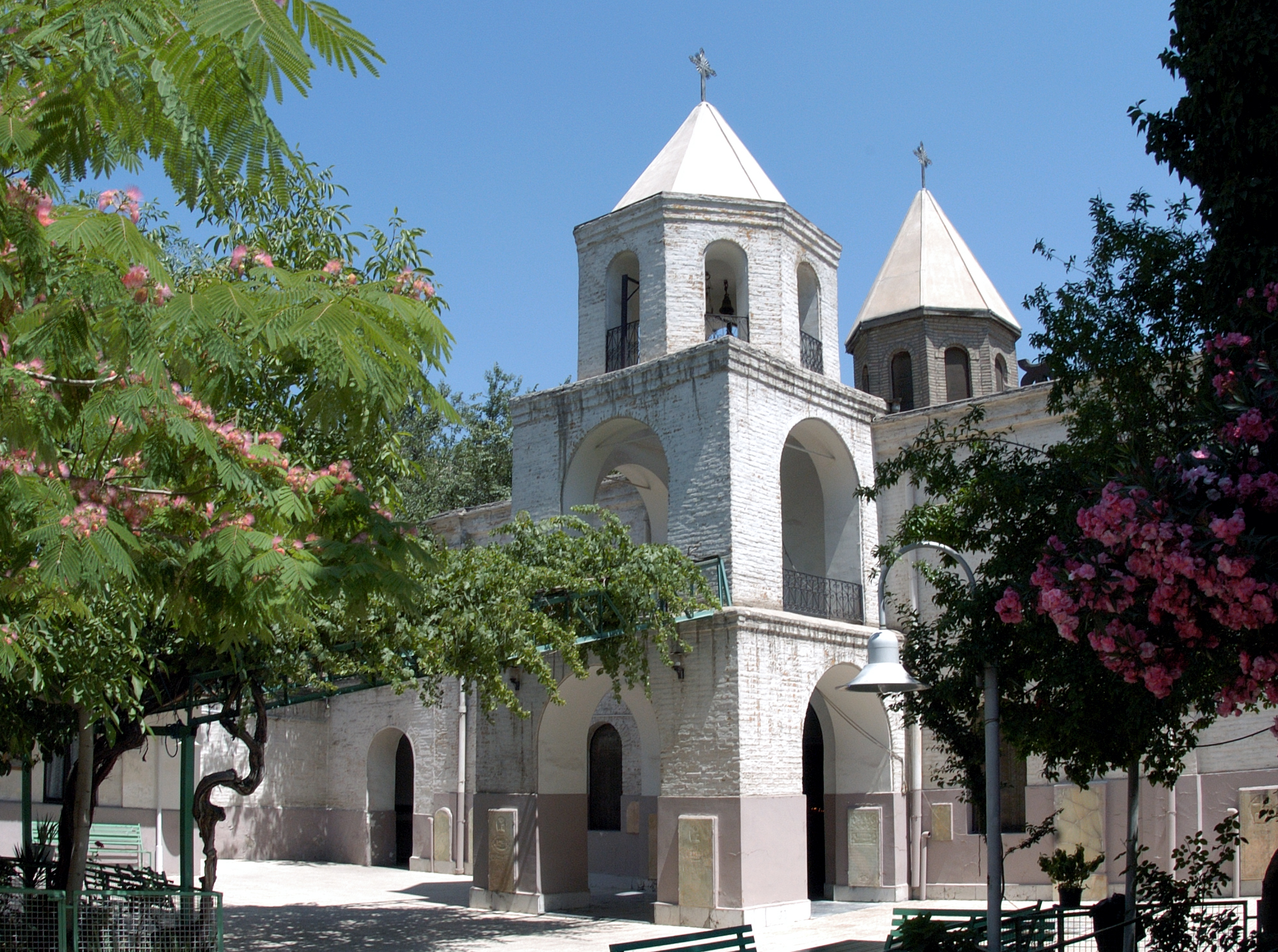
Saint George Armenian Church in Shahpur Ave.

==== Assyrian Church of the East ====
- Saint George Church (Mar Gevargiz) – Bagh-e-Shah (fa) – 1962
- Holy Mary Church (Mart Maryam) – Sarbaz St. – 1978

==== Eastern Orthodox churches ====
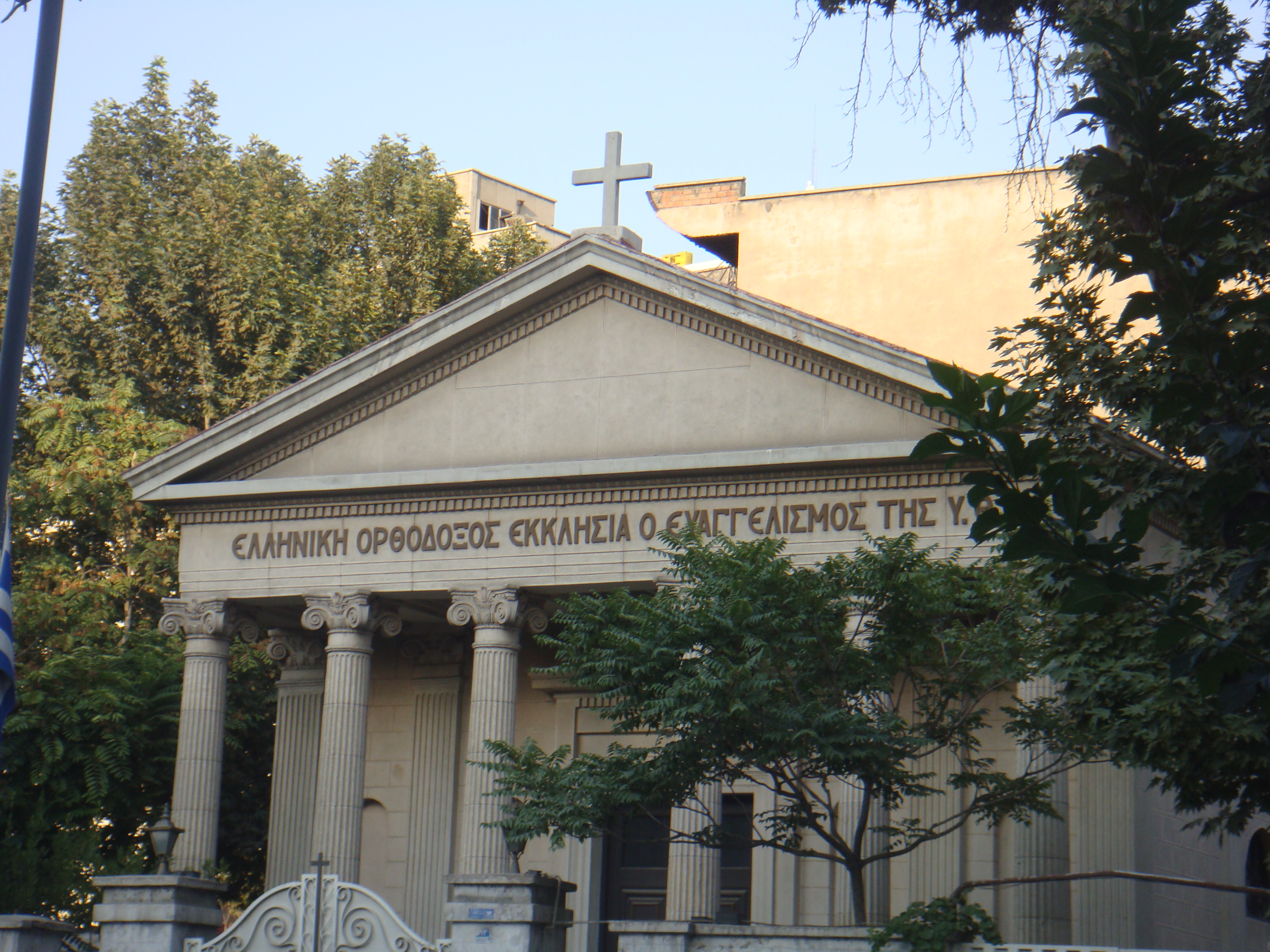
Greek Orthodox Church of Saint Mary, Tehran

- Holy Mary Greek Orthodox Church – Roosevelt St. – 1941
- St. Nicholas Russian Orthodox Church – Roosevelt St. – 1945
- Russian Orthodox Chapel – Doulab Russian Cemetery

=== Catholic churches ===
==== Armenian Catholic ====
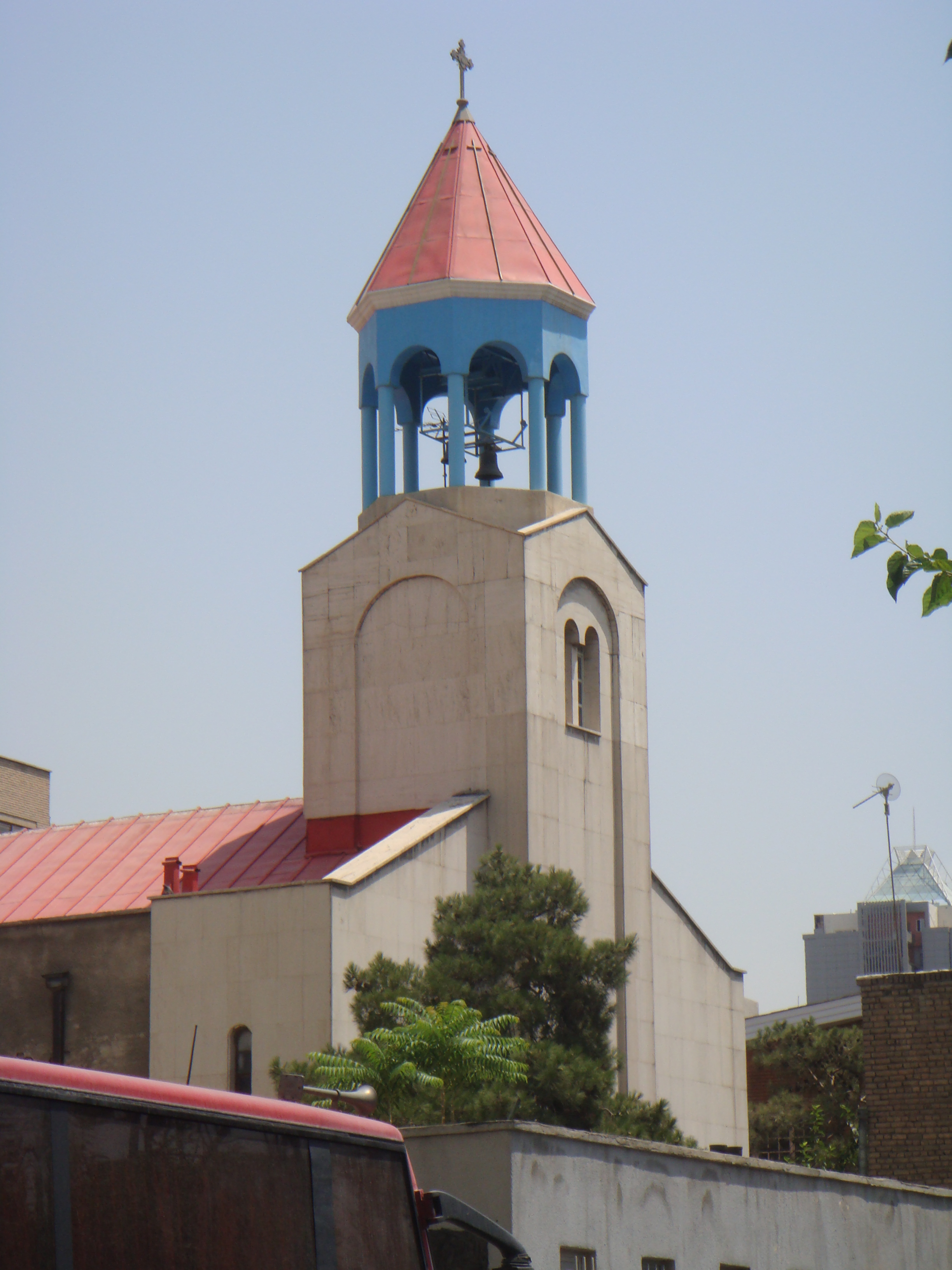
Saint Gregory the Illuminator Armenian-Catholic Church in Tehran, (2011)

- Saint Gregory the Illuminator Church (Սուրբ Գրիգոր Լուսաւորիչ եկեղեցի) – Ghazali St. – 1954
- Saint Joseph Church (Սուրբ Յովսէփ եկեղեցի) – Mirdamad Blvd. – 1963
- Holy Mary Church (Սուրբ Աստվածածին եկեղեցի) – Yusefabad
- Armenian Catholic Chapel – Doulab Armenian Catholic Cemetery – 1946

==== Chaldean Catholic ====
- Saint Joseph Cathedral (Mar Yozef) – Forsat St. – 1950
- Holy Virgin Church – Appadana St.
- Chaldean Catholic Chapel – Eslamshahr Catholic Cemetery – 1967

==== Roman Catholic ====
- Holy Heart of Christ Roman Catholic Church – Old Shemiran Road (fa) – 1920
- Roman Catholic Cathedral of the Consolata – France St. (fa) – 1937
- St. Joan of Arc Roman Catholic Church (Lazarists) – Manouchehri St. – 1945
- Saint Abraham's Church (Dominican) – Jamalzadeh St. (fa) – 1966

=== Protestant churches ===
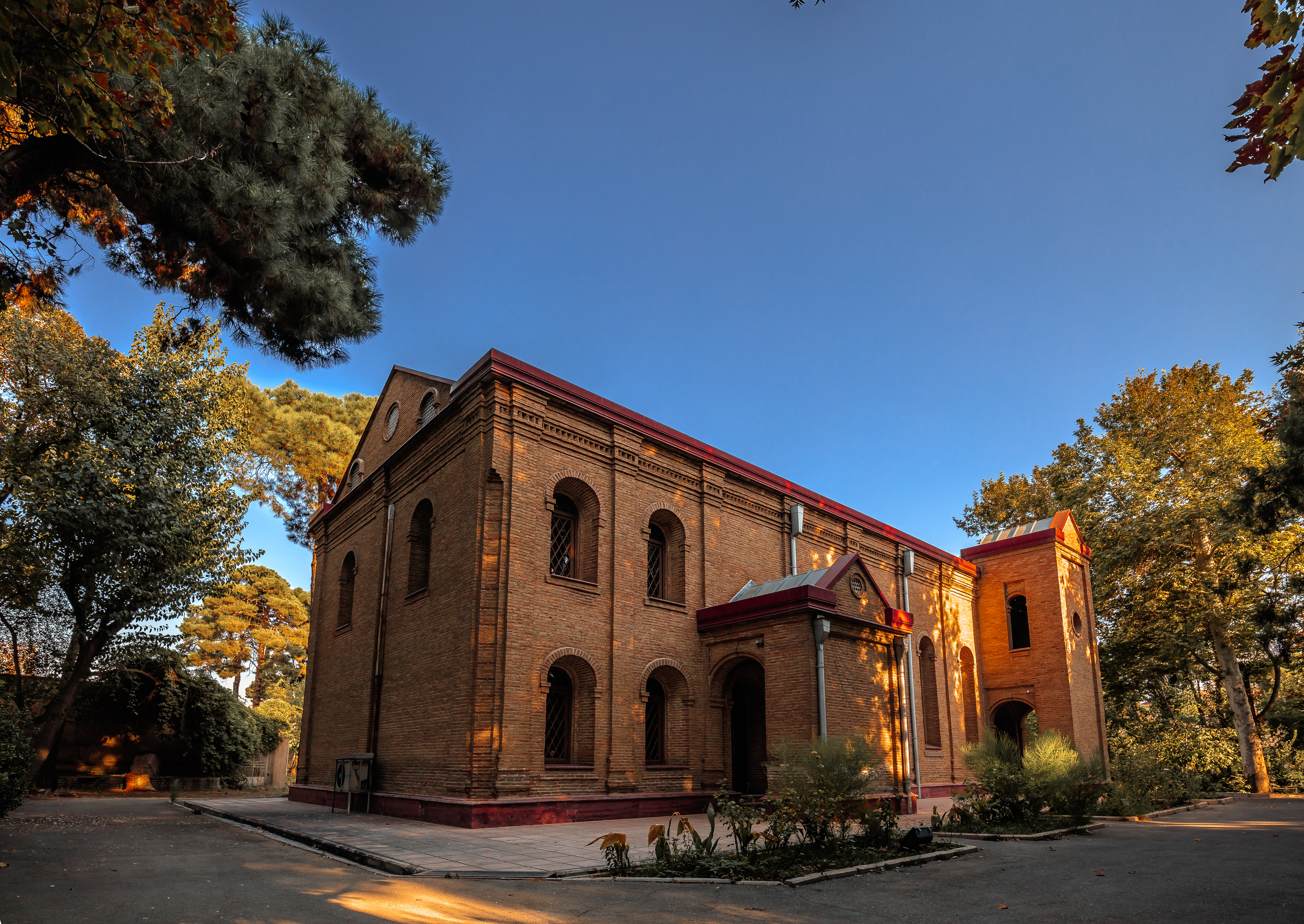
St. Peter Protestant Church

==== Evangelical Church ====
- St. Peter Evangelical Church (American) (fa) – Qavam St. (fa) – 1873
- Emmanuel Protestant Church – Tavanir St. – 1972
- Saint John (Սուրբ Յովհաննէս եկեղեցի) Armenian Protestant Church – Nader Shah Ave. – 1964
- St. Thomas (Mar Toma) Assyrian Evangelical Church (fa) – Amirabad – 1967
- Christuskirche (Christ Church) German Evangelical Church – Yakhchal St. – 1963

==== Anglican ====
- St. Paul Anglican Church (fa) – Hafez St. (fa) – 1967

==== Assemblies of God ====
- Assemblies of God Church – Takht-e-Jamshid Ave. (fa) – 1971

==== Evangelical Brotherhood ====
- Armenian Evangelical Brotherhood Church – Aban St. – 1970
- Assyrian Brotherhood Church – ShahrAra St.

==== Seventh-Day Adventist ====
- Seventh-Day Adventist Church – Rasht St. – 1955

== Synagogues ==
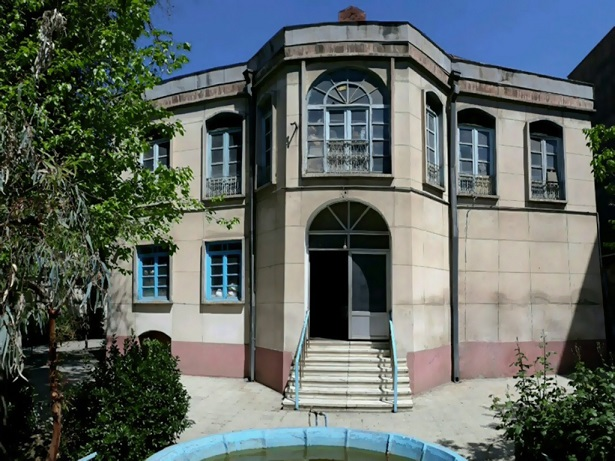
Haim Synagogue, Tehran

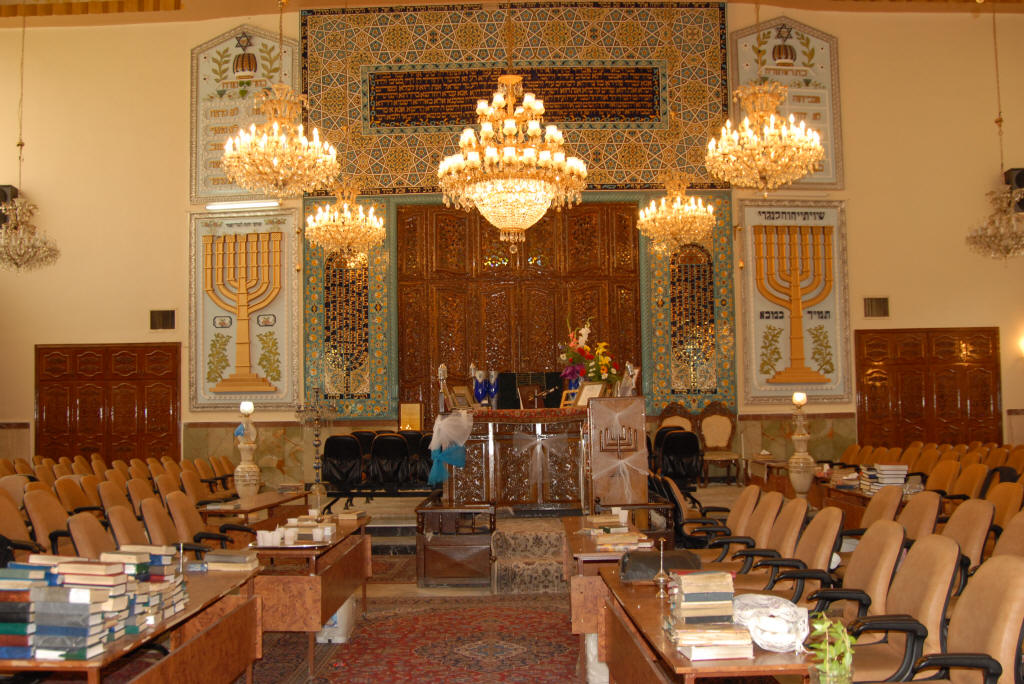
Yusefabad Synagogue (Suket Shalim), Tehran

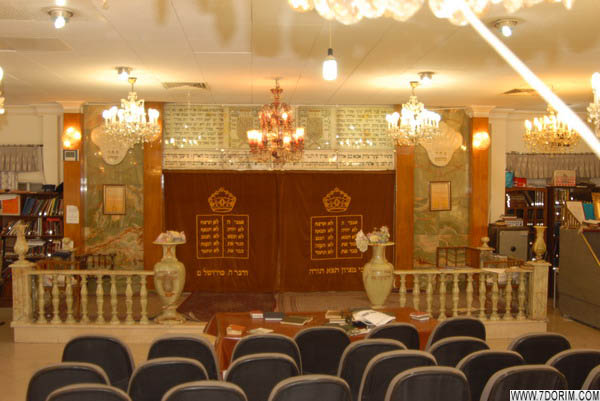
Abrishami Synagogue, Tehran

- AbdullahZadeh Synagogue
- Abrishami Synagogue – Kakh St. (fa) – 1965
- AzizKhan Synagogue – Hafez Ave. (fa) – 1920s
- Bagh-e Saba Synagogue (fa) – Bagh-e Saba (fa) – 1951
- Daniel (Polish) Synagogue – Qavam St. (fa) – 1960
- Darvazeh Dowlat Synagogue – Darvazeh Dowlat (fa)
- Ettefagh Synagogue (Iraqi) – Shahreza Ave. – 1947
- Ettehad Synagogue – Jaleh St. (fa)
- Ezra Yaghoub Synagogue – Cyrus Ave. – 19th century
- Gorgan Synagogue – Gorgan St.
- Fakhrabad Synagogue – Fakhrabad
- Haim Synagogue – Qavam St. – 1913
- Hakim Asher Synagogue – Cyrus Ave. – 19th century
- Harambam Synagogue
- Khorasaniha Synagogue – Zartosht St. – 1975
- Kohan Synagogue
- Kurosh Synagogue
- Levian Synagogue
- Ma'ariv Synagogue
- Molla Hanina Synagogue – Cyrus Ave. – 19th century
- Nosrat Synagogue
- Pesian Synagogue (fa) – Zaferanieh – 1970
- Pol-e-Choobi Synagogue – Pol-e Choobi (fa)
- Rafi'-Nia synagogue
- Rah-e Danesh Synagogue – Yusefabad – 1966
- Gisha Synagogue – Gisha
- Tafian (Hakim) Synagogue
- Yusefabad Synagogue (Suket Shalim) – Yusefabad – 1966
- Zargarian Synagogue – Amirabad

== Gurdwaras ==
- Tehran Sikh gurdwara – Baharestan Sq.

== Other religious centers ==
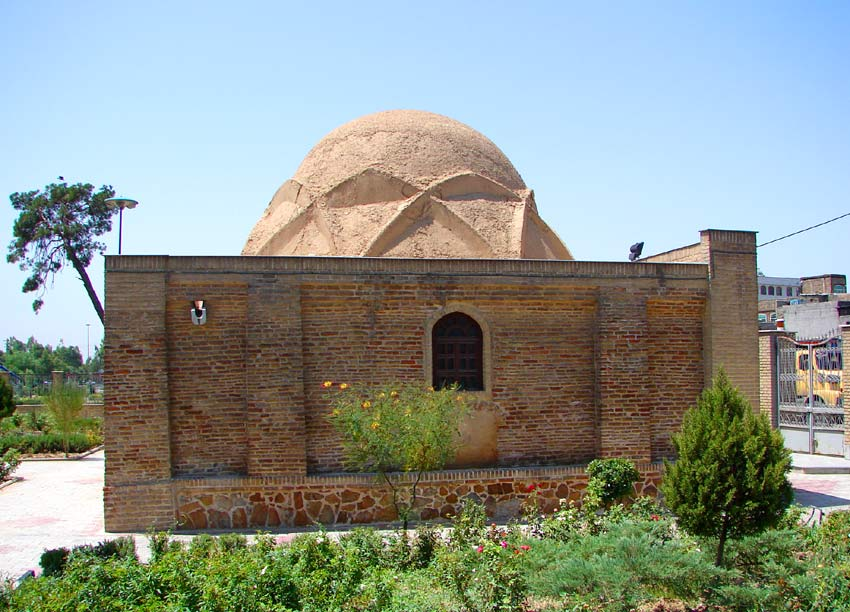
Javan-Mard Qassab Mausoleum, Rey

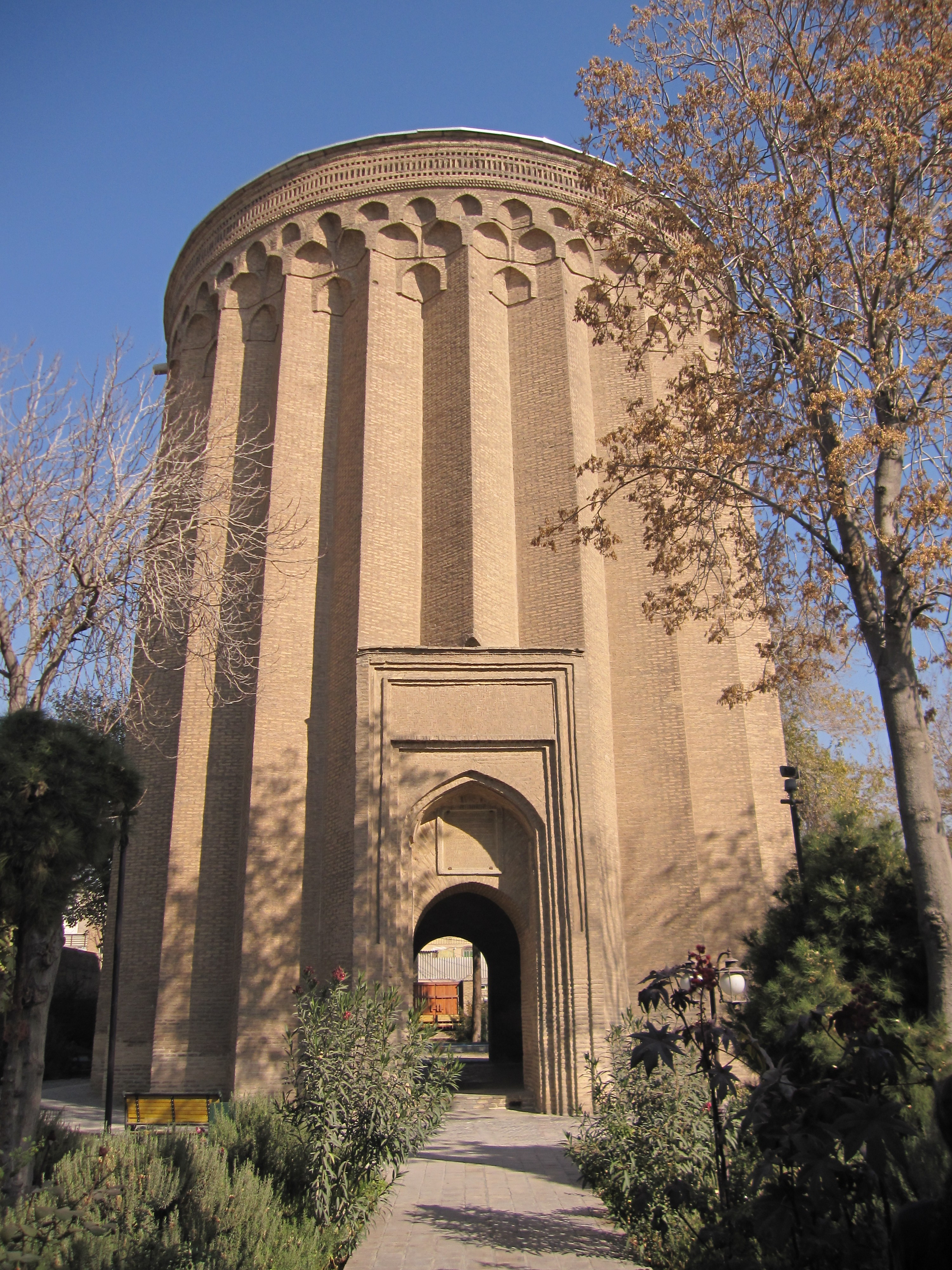
Tughril I's Mausoleum, Rey

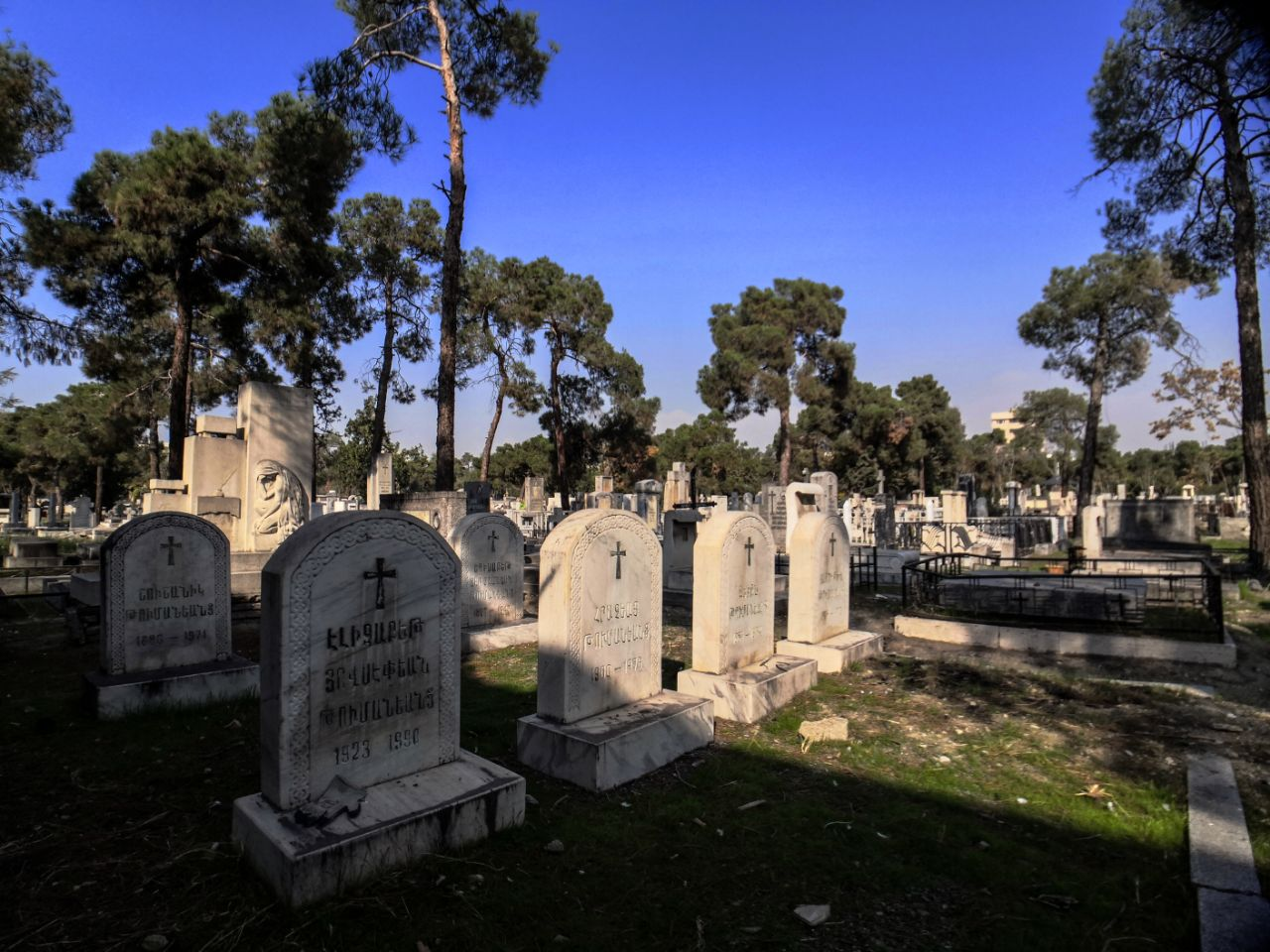
Doulab Cemetery

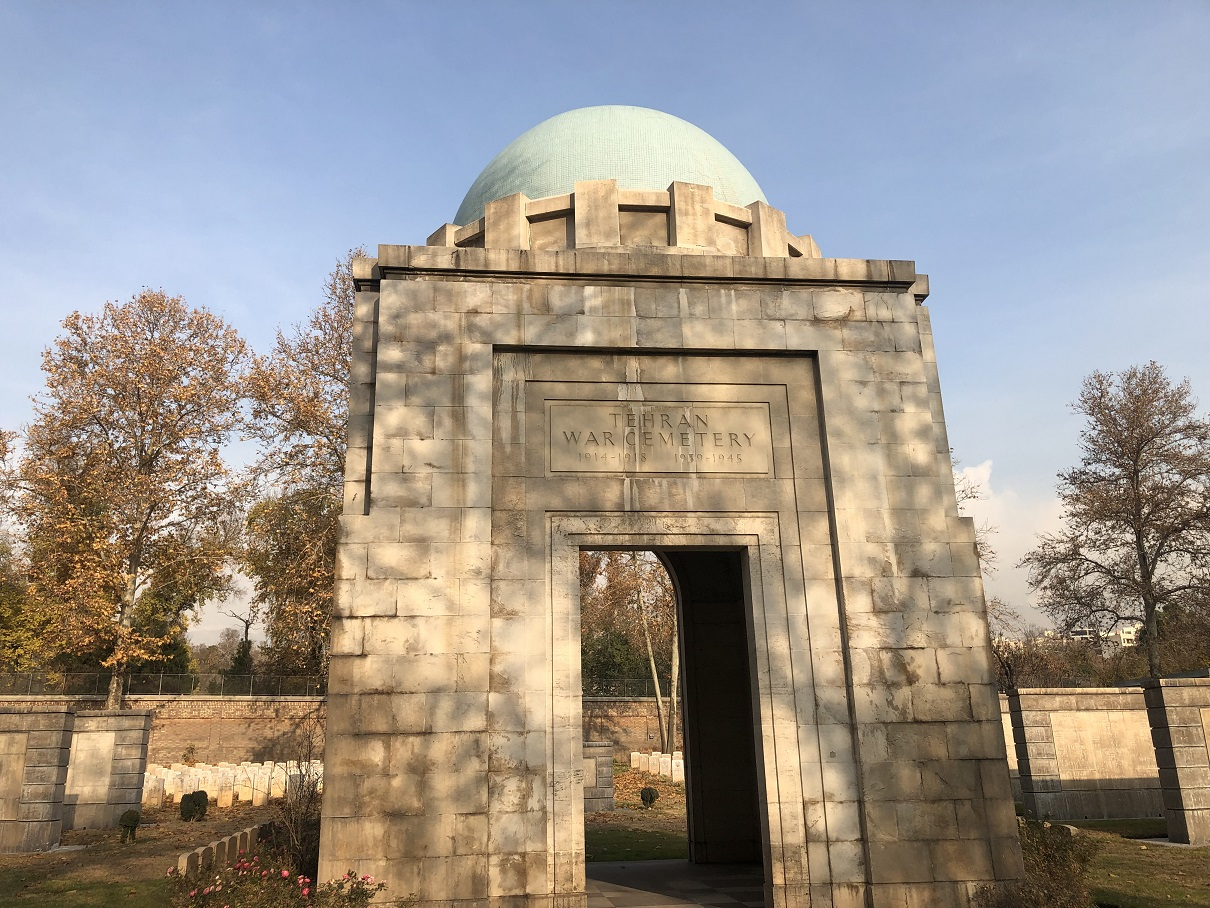
Tehran War Cemetery

- Ebn-e Babveyh Mausoleum and cemetery and Tughril Bey's Mausoleum – Rey
- Javan-Mard Qassab Mausoleum – mausoleum of a pre-Islamic semi-mythical hero – Rey
- Seyedeh Malek Khatoun Mausoleum – Khavaran Rd.
- Pir-e Ata Mausoleum (fa) – Pamenar
- Sar-e Qabr-e Aqa Mausoleum (fa) – Mowlavi St.
- Sheikh Abdollah Tarashti Mausoleum (fa) – Tarasht
- Sheikh Hadi Najmabadi Mausoleum (fa) – Naderi Ave.
- Dozens of Saqa Khanehs (fa): traditional places of prayer.
- Behesht-e Zahra cemetery and Mausoleum of Ruhollah Khomeini
- Safi-Ali Shahi khanqah (fa) – Baharestan Sq. – 1877–98 (1294–1316 AH)
- Nematollahi (Amir-Soleimani) Hosseinieh and khanqah – Sangelaj – 1863 (1280 AH)
- Zahir-od-Dowleh khanqah and cemetery – Tajrish – 1924, where many Iranian giants of art and culture such as Iraj Mirza, Mohammad Taghi Bahar, Forough Farrokhzad, Abolhasan Saba, Ruhollah Khaleghi, and Darvish Khan are buried.
- Tehran War Cemetery – Qolhak, British Embassy Garden, where numerous World War II western Allied soldiers are buried.
- Polish Cemetery (Catholic Cemetery) – Doulab
- Doulab Cemetery with the Russian Unknown Soldier's Tomb (Cenotaph) is located here with a red star over it.
- Naghareh Khaneh Tower (fa) – Rey

== See also ==
- List of Armenian churches in Iran
- List of synagogues in Iran
- List of cemeteries in Iran
- Religion in Iran
