= Rafi'-Nia synagogue =

Destroyed synagogue in Tehran, Iran

Rafi'nia Synagogue
- The synagogue in 2009

- Location of the synagogue in Tehran

Religion
- Affiliation: Judaism
- Province: Tehran Province
- Ecclesiastical or organisational status: Synagogue
- Status: Destroyed

Location
- Location: Valiasr Street, Bozorgmehr Street, Freyman Street, Malek Alley, Tehran
- Country: Iran
- Coordinates: 35°42′16″N 51°24′05″E

Architecture
- Type: Synagogue architecture
- Style: Pahlavi
- Completed: 1958
- Destroyed: 2026

Rafi'nia Synagogue (Persian: کنیسه رفیع‌نیا), also known as the Mashhadi Synagogue or the Khorasani Synagogue of Tehran, was a synagogue of the Jewish community in Tehran, Iran. It was destroyed in an attack by the Israeli military during the 2026 Iran war. It was located on Valiasr Street, Bozorgmehr Street, Freyman Street, Malek Alley, near Taleghani Street and Palestine Street, and one building away from the former Israeli Embassy in Tehran. This synagogue, along with the Azizkhan, Levian, and Nosrat synagogues, was among the synagogues of the Khorasani Association (Mashhadi Jews). Its name is derived from the Rafī'nia family, one of the Jewish service families from the Mashhadi community.

== History ==
=== 20th century ===
At the same time as Jews settled in the Keshavarz Boulevard area (formerly Elizabeth), Abdolrahman Rafī'nia built this synagogue in 1958 in two floors. The main floor (second floor) was allocated to Mashhadis, while the ground floor was allocated to Kermanis. In the 1970s, Rabbi Musa Zargari held classes on religious studies and the Torah in this synagogue for some time. The synagogue donated 2 million Iranian rials for the construction of Khorasaniha Synagogue in 1970. According to the Iranian outlet Shargh, it was "one of the most important places for Khorasan Jews to gather and celebrate."

=== 21st century ===
The synagogue was renovated in 2016. In recent years, due to the decline in the Jewish population, only the upper floor was in use, while the lower floor served as the residence of the synagogue caretaker.

== Attack and destruction ==
Members of the Tehran Jewish community navigating the site where the Rafi'-Nia synagogue was destroyed

During the Iran–United States–Israel war on 7 April 2026 at 3:15 a.m., the synagogue was completely destroyed following a US and Israeli attack on an adjacent residential building, and Torah scrolls remained under the rubble. It is likely that the centuries-old Torah scrolls of the synagogue were also severely damaged.

The IDF said it was targeting an Iranian commander, who was located in the adjacent Khatam al-Anbiya headquarters. It said the destruction of the synagogue was "collateral damage" caused by the airstrike to the adjacent building. There were no reports of casualties following the strike. Religious texts were buried under the rubble of the collapsing synagogue, alongside two people who were assisted by the Red Crescent through a "high-stakes" rescue operation.

=== Reactions ===
Homayoun Sameh-Yah Najafabadi, head of the Tehran Jewish Committee and representative of Iranian Jews in the Islamic Consultative Assembly, said that Israel did not spare the Jewish community even during Jewish holidays and targeted one of their sacred synagogues. Siamak Moreh Sedgh, former Jewish representative in parliament, stated: "A synagogue is a place of worship; no military activity was conducted there; no drones were built, and no launchers were present." The Iranian Jewish community condemned the attack in a statement signed by Rabbi Younes Hamami Lalehzar, the religious leader of the community.

Abbas Salehi, Iran's Minister of Culture and Islamic Guidance, described the destruction as bitter and distressing. Seyyed Mahmoud Alavi, head of Iran's Council of Ethnicities, Religions, and Denominations, called the attack "a clear insult to religious sanctities and fundamental human rights." Mohammad Reza Aref, First Vice President, described attacks on religious sites such as churches and synagogues as "an attack on the heart of Iran." Mohammad Javad Zarif wrote in response: "Wake up, world: who is the real threat to Judaism?"

The Israel Defense Forces initially did not respond to requests for comment. An Israeli government official stated: "Israel doesn't target synagogues. Anyone claiming otherwise thinks you're gullible." Later, the Israeli military confirmed that the synagogue was damaged as a result of its strike, stating that the target was a senior commander of the emergency command of Khatam al-Anbiya Headquarters, and expressed regret for the synagogue's damage as "collateral damage." The Israeli Ministry of Diaspora Affairs and Combating Antisemitism stated that multiple sources—"all Iranian," as noted—confirmed damage to the synagogue, but suggested that claims of its complete destruction were likely exaggerated for propaganda purposes. The Israeli Prime Minister’s Office also responded to a request from The Times of Israel by stating: "Iran fires missiles at civilians; Israel targets terrorist infrastructure. Missiles at civilians versus precise strikes at terrorist targets—that is the difference."

== See also ==
- List of synagogues in Iran
- Destruction of cultural heritage sites during the 2026 Iran war
