= Zargarian Synagogue =

Synagogue in Tehran, Iran

- Location of the synagogue in Tehran

Religion
- Affiliation: Judaism
- Ecclesiastical or organizational status: Synagogue
- Status: Active

Location
- Location: Amir Abad, Tehran
- Country: Iran
- Interactive map of Zargarian Synagogue
- Coordinates: 35°42′26″N 51°23′22″E

Architecture
- Architect: Manuchehr Kohan
- Type: Synagogue architecture
- Style: Pahlavi
- Founder: Abdullah Eliahu Zargarian
- Established: 1971 (as a congregation)
- Completed: 1974

Specifications
- Capacity: 500 worshippers
- Site area: 1,000 m^{2} (11,000 sq ft)

Zargarian Synagogue (Persian: کنیسه زرگریان) is a Jewish congregation and synagogue located in the Amir Abad neighborhood of Tehran, in Iran.

== History ==
The synagogue was created in an area of 1,000 square metres (11,000 sq ft) with the help of Abdullah Eliahu Zargarian. With an increase in the number of Jews in Amirabad street, Abdullah Zargarian decided to create the synagogue in 1350 SH (1971–1972 AD). He found a suitable piece of property south of Keshavarz (Elizabeth) Boulevard and he approached the Tehran Jewish Committee with his proposal. He received help from Musa Barlaavi, Esmail Khodadadi, and Musa Sassooni. The Tehran Jewish Committee and the Jews of Tehran helped him in his endeavors and the head of Alliance Israélite Universelle (AIU) in Iran, Mr. Cohenka, pledged help if Abdullah Zargarian creates an Alliance school as well. The plan was fetched and it was sent to the AIU headquarters in France and after 45 days Manuchehr Kohan was selected as the chief architect. The plan started in 1350 AH and was finished in 1352 AH (1973–1974 AD).

The synagogue was constructed by Manuchehr Kohan and Hoshang Hassidim in four floors and can hold 500 people. Abdullah Daghighian was selected as the principal of the Alliance School in Tehran by the Alliance headquarters in France.

== See also ==
- History of the Jews in Iran
- List of synagogues in Iran
