= Sanandaj Synagogue =

Synagogue in Sanandaj, Iran

- Hebrew: בית כנסת סננדג'; Persian: کنیسه سنندج
- Location of the synagogue in Iran

Religion
- Affiliation: Judaism
- Ecclesiastical or organizational status: Synagogue
- Status: Active

Location
- Location: Persian: کوچه کنعان ۳, Sanandaj, Kurdistan Province
- Country: Iran
- Interactive map of Sanandaj Synagogue
- Coordinates: 35°18′53″N 47°00′06″E

Architecture
- Completed: Safavid era

The Sanandaj Synagogue (Hebrew: בית כנסת סננדג'; Persian: کنیسه سنندج) or Bozorg Synagogue, is a synagogue, located on Persian: کوچه کنعان ۳, in Sanandaj, in the Kurdistan Province of Iran. It is registered as #26979 in the Iran national index. The synagogue was constructed in the Safavid-era, from 1501 to 1736, and was listed on the Iran National Heritage List.

Sanandaj was the center of Aramaic-speaking Jewry in Persia. The Jewish community in Sanandaj dwindled considerably following the Islamic revolution of 1979. As of 2000, no Jews lived in Sanandaj.

== See also ==
- History of the Jews in Iran
- List of synagogues in Iran
