= Khatam al-Anbiya Headquarters =

Khatam-al Anbiya Headquarter (Persian: قرارگاه خاتم‌الانبیا) may refer to:

- Khatam al-Anbiya Central Headquarters of the General Staff of Armed Forces, Iran
- Khatam al-Anbiya Construction Headquarters, an Iranian engineering firm controlled by the Iranian Revolutionary Guard
- Khatam al-Anbiya Air Defense Headquarters of the Islamic Republic of Iran Air Defense Force

== See also ==
- Khatme Nabuwwat (disambiguation)
