= Younes Hamami Lalehzar =

Iranian rabbi, physician, and community leader (born 1965)

Rabbi Younes Hamami Lalehzar
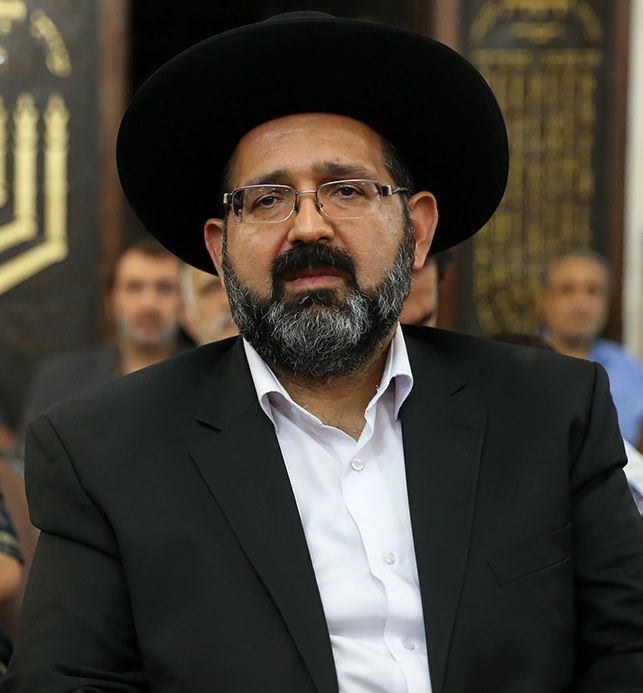
- Anniversary of Ruhollah Khomeini, Yusef Abad Synagogue - 30 May 2018

Spokesperson for the Beth Din of Tehran Jewish Committee

Rabbi at Yeshiva of Abrishami Synagogue
- Incumbent
- Assumed office 1996

Personal details
- Born: 1965 (age 60–61) Yazd, Iran
- Spouse: Helen Moghaddam
- Children: 2 daughters, 1 son
- Education: Shahid Beheshti University
- Occupation: Religious leader

Rabbi Younes Hamami Lalehzar (Persian: یونس حمامی لاله‌زار) is an Iranian rabbi, physician, and community leader.

== Early life ==
Younes Hamami was born in 1965 in Yazd, Iran in a religious Jewish family. His father, Musa Hamami was one of the prominent merchants of Yazd. He studied at Alliance Israelite Universelle school in Yazd and Tehran. In 1986 he entered Shahid Beheshti University to study medicine and he finished his medical degree in 1993. In 2001 he obtained his internal medicine board from the same school.

He has been working as an internal physician in Tehran's Dr. Sapir Hospital and Charity Center since 2001.

During the same time, he studied Jewish religious law under the supervision of famous Iranian Rabbis such as Musa Rabbani, Zion Hakakian, Musa Tajian, and Levi Hayyim. He further studied Torah and Talmud under chief Rabbi Uriel Davidi and Rabbi Baal Nes in Shiraz.

He has been the spokesperson for the Beth din of Tehran Jewish Committee. He further helped create official religious books for Jewish students in high school. He has been teaching in Yeshiva of Abrishami Synagogue since 1996.

== Personal life ==
Younes Hamami is married to Helen Moghaddam. They have two daughters and a son.

== See also ==
- Tehran Jewish Committee
- Abrishami Synagogue
