= Molla Hanina Synagogue =

Synagogue in Tehran, Iran

- Hebrew: בית הכנסת מולא חנינא
- Location of the synagogue in Tehran

Religion
- Affiliation: Judaism
- Ecclesiastical or organizational status: Synagogue
- Status: Active

Location
- Location: 7 Sarjonbak Alley, Oudlajan, Tehran
- Country: Iran
- Interactive map of Molla Hanina Synagogue
- Coordinates: 35°40′41.61″N 51°25′51.56″E

Architecture
- Type: Synagogue architecture
- Style: Qajar architecture
- Founder: Molla Hanina Melamed Yazdi
- Completed: late 19th century

Specifications
- Capacity: 50 worshippers
- Site area: 127 m^{2} (1,370 sq ft)

The Molla Hanina Synagogue (Persian: کنیسه ملا حنینا; Hebrew: בית הכנסת מולא חנינא), or Mollah Haninah Synagogue, is a Jewish congregation and synagogue, located at 7 Sarjonbak Alley (Taghavi Street), in the Old Jewish Quarter, in the Oudlajan neighborhood of Tehran, Iran. Established in the late 19th century, it is one of the oldest and, located on a 127 m^{2} (1,370 sq ft) site, one of the smallest synagogues in Tehran.

== History ==
The synagogue was established during the reign of Mozaffar ad-Din Shah Qajar. Molla Hanina Melamed Yazdi is known to have founded the synagogue. Molla Hanina died in 1283 SH (1904–1905 AD) and the synagogue was managed by the Jewish Council since then. The synagogue was also a precursor of the Dr. Sapir Hospital and Charity Center which is the only Jewish hospital in Tehran, as Dr. Sapir used to treat patients in one of the rooms of the synagogue.

Today the population of Jews in Oudlajan is relatively low and the synagogue is only open on Sabbaths.

== See also ==
- History of the Jews in Iran
- List of synagogues in Iran
