= List of synagogues in Iran =

List of active synagogues in Iran

== Tehran ==
- Abdollah Zadeh Synagogue
- Abrishami Synagogue
- Aziz-Khan Synagogue
- Bagh-e Saba Synagogue (fa)
- Danial Synagogue (Polish)
- Darvazeh Dowlat Synagogue
- Ettefagh Synagogue (Iraqi)
- Ettehad Synagogue
- Ezra Yaghoub Synagogue
- Fakhrabad Synagogue
- Gisha Synagogue
- Gorgan Synagogue
- Haim Synagogue
- Hakim Asher Synagogue
- HaRambam Synagogue (Rambam Synagogue)
- Kohan Synagogue
- Kourosh Synagogue
- Khorasaniha Synagogue (Mashhadi)
- Levian Synagogue
- Mahariv Synagogue
- Molla Hanina Synagogue
- Nosrat Synagogue
- Orsharga Synagogue
- Pol-e Choobi Synagogue
- Rafi'-Nia synagogue (destroyed in US-Israeli attack)
- Rah-e Danesh Synagogue
- Seyed-Khandan Synagogue
- Tafian (Hakim) (Pesyan) Synagogue (fa)
- Tarasht Synagogue
- Yousefabad Synagogue
- Yousefzadeh Synagogue
- Zargarian Synagogue

== Shiraz ==
- Bozorg Synagogue
- Delrahim Synagogue
- Gharbi Synagogue
- Hadash Synagogue (fa)
- Khaneh Javanan Synagogue
- Khorasaniha Synagogue
- Kohanim Synagogue
- Kowsar Synagogue
- Magen Haim Synagogue
- Molla Mishi Synagogue
- Molla Pinhas Synagogue
- Molla Owram Synagogue
- Movarekh Synagogue
- New Kazerouniha Synagogue
- Old Kazerouniha Synagogue
- Rabbizadeh Synagogue (fa)
- Sehati Synagogue
- Shokr Synagogue

== Isfahan ==
- Joubareh
- Serah bet Asher Shrine
- Molla Mari Shrine
- Amoo Shaya Synagogue (fa)
- Asiaban Synagogue (fa)
- Bozorg (Gadol) Synagogue (fa)
- Golbahar Synagogue (fa)
- Haj Elyahu Synagogue (fa)
- Hanasab Synagogue
- Jamaati Synagogue (fa)
- Keter David Synagogue (fa)
- Khorshidi Synagogue (fa)
- Kowsar Synagogue
- Molla David Synagogue (fa)
- Molla Neissan Synagogue (fa)
- Molla Rabbi Synagogue (fa)
- Molla Soleiman Synagogue
- Molla Yaghoub Synagogue (fa)
- Moshe Haya Synagogue (fa)
- Saeidian Synagogue
- Sang-Bast Synagogue (fa)
- Sarah bet Asher Synagogue
- Shmuel Geli Synagogue (fa)
- Shokrollah Synagogue (fa)
- Yaghoub bet Asher Synagogue
- Yousef Shmuel Shimon Synagogue (fa)

== Yazd ==
- Molla Agha Baba Synagogue (fa)
- Kamal Synagogue (fa)
- Eliahu Hanavi Synagogue
- Eli Synagogue
- Hadash Synagogue
- Hakham Synagogue
- Mizan Synagogue
- Molla Shlomo Synagogue

== Hamadan ==
- Esther and Mordecai Shrine
- Habakkuk Shrine
- Alliance Synagogue
- Bozorg Synagogue
- Haggai Nabi Synagogue (fa) (fa)
- Kalimian Synagogue
- Molla Abraham
- Molla Rabbi

== Sanandaj ==
- Bozorg Synagogue
- Koochik Synagogue

== Kermanshah ==
- Ettehad Synagogue
- Hadash (Novin) Synagogue
- Yaghoub Now Synagogue

== Rafsanjan ==
- Ghadim (Old) Synagogue
- New Synagogue

== Kerman ==
- Kerman Synagogue

== Bushehr ==
- Kooti Synagogue

== Tabriz ==
- Koochik Synagogue

== Urmia ==
- Daneshgah-e Kalimi

== Boroujerd ==
- Boroujerd Synagogue

== Babol ==
- Khoshnoud Synagogue

== Bibliography ==
- Loeb, Lawrence (2002). "Travels Through Iran: A Photo Journal". In Houman Sarshar (ed.). Esther's Children: A Portrait of Iranian Jews. Philadelphia: Jewish Publication Society of America. pp. 337–365. ISBN 978-0-8276-0751-4.
