= Rah-e Danesh Synagogue =

Synagogue in Tehran, Iran

- Location of the synagogue in Tehran

Religion
- Affiliation: Judaism
- Ecclesiastical or organizational status: Synagogue
- Status: Active

Location
- Location: Tehran
- Country: Iran
- Interactive map of Rah-e Danesh Synagogue
- Coordinates: 35°43′41″N 51°24′23″E

Architecture
- Completed: 1971
- Site area: 240 square metres (2,600 sq ft)

Rah-e Danesh Synagogue (Persian: کنیسه راه دانش) is a Jewish congregation and synagogue, located near Yusefabad Street in Tehran, Iran.

== History ==
In the 1340s SH (1961–1971 AD), the number of Jews in the Yusefabad neighborhood increased dramatically. Thus, a group of Jews decided to create the Synagogue in the Yusefabad street in the twentieth alley. The building, which also contains a Jewish school, was built over three levels. The 240-square-metre (2,600 sq ft) synagogue is located on the third floor.

The synagogue experienced major reconstruction in 1388 SH (2009–2010 AD).

== See also ==
- History of the Jews in Iran
- List of synagogues in Iran
