= Lorzadeh Mosque =

Mosque in Tehran, Iran

- مسجد لرزاده
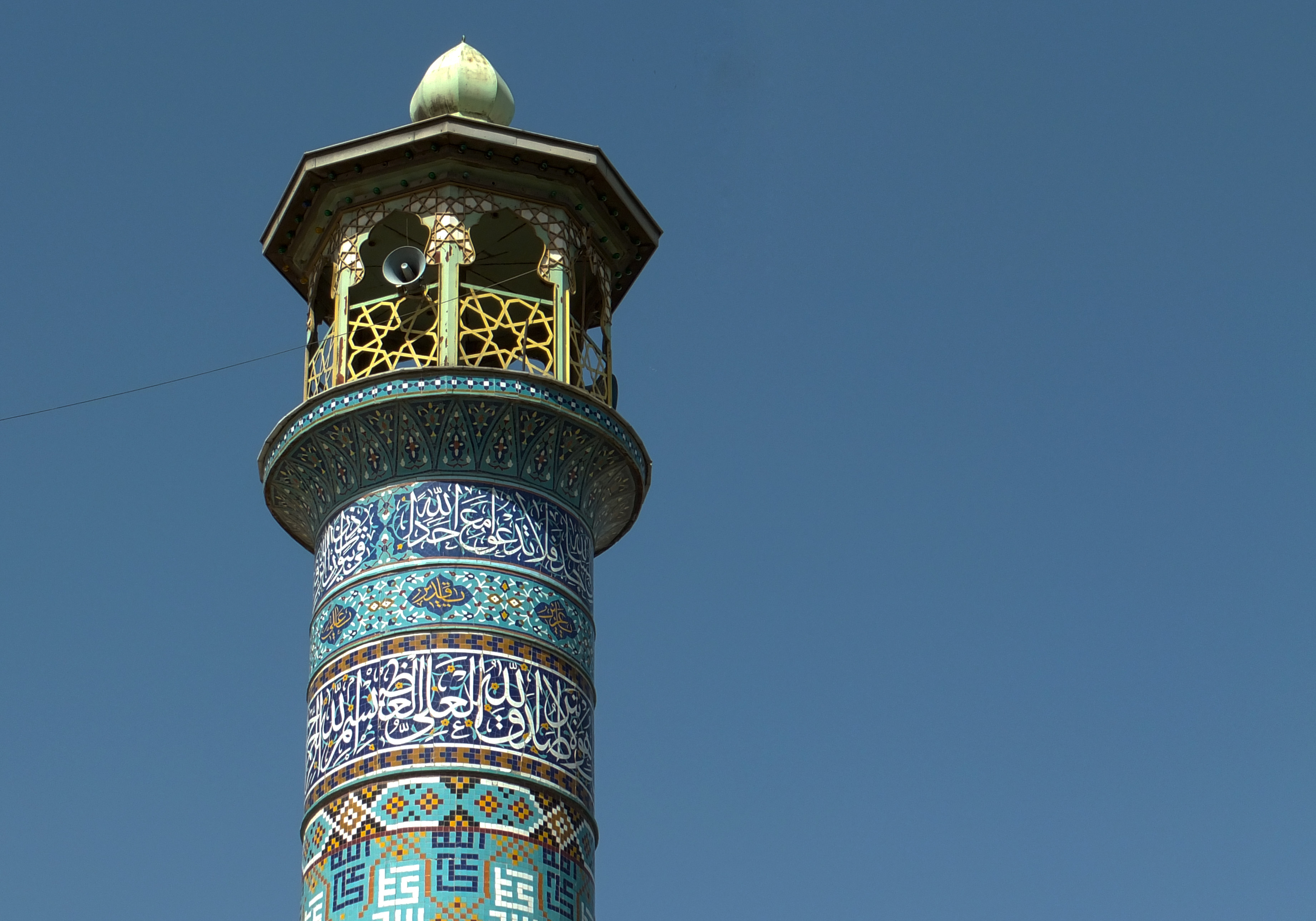
- The mosque minaret in 2016

- Location of the mosque in Tehran

Religion
- Affiliation: Shia Islam
- Ecclesiastical or organizational status: Mosque
- Status: Active

Location
- Location: Lorzadeh Street, Tehran, Tehran province
- Country: Iran
- Interactive map of Lorzadeh Mosque
- Coordinates: 35°39′58″N 51°26′23″E

Architecture
- Type: Mosque architecture
- Style: Pahlavi
- Completed: c. 1940s CE (14th century SH)

Specifications
- Dome: One (maybe more)
- Minaret: One (maybe more)

The Lorzadeh Mosque (Persian: مسجد لرزاده; Arabic: مسجد لرزادة), sometimes spelled as the Lor Zadeh Mosque, is a mosque located on Lorzadeh Street in the city of Tehran, in the province of Tehran, Iran. The mosque was completed in c. 1940s CE, during the 14th century SH.

The mosque was used as a polling station during various Iranian presidential elections.

== See also ==
- Shia Islam in Iran
- List of mosques in Iran
