= Shahrara =

Neighbourhood in Tehran, Iran

Coordinates: 35.6°N 51.4°E

Shahrara is a neighbourhood located in northern Tehran, Iran.
