= Khatme Nabuwwat =

Khatme Nabuwwat (also spelt Khatme Nabuwat or Khatme Nubuwwat) refers to the Islamic concept of the Seal of the Prophets, declaring the finality of prophets ending with Muhammad.

It may also refer to:

- Majlis-e-Tahaffuz-e-Khatme Nabuwwat, an anti-Ahmadiyya Pakistani organisation devoted to protecting the concept of Khatme Nabuwwat
- Aalmi Majlis Tahaffuz Khatm-e-Nubuwwat, an anti-Ahmadiyya Pakistani organisation
- International Majlis-e Tahaffuz-e-Khatm-e Nobuwat Bangladesh (IKNMB), an anti-Ahmadiyya organisation in Bangladesh
- Khatme Nabuwat Andolon Bangladesh, an anti-Ahmadiyya splinter group of IKNMB
- Khatme Nubuwwat Academy, an anti-Ahmadiyya organisation in London

== See also ==
- Khatam al-Anbiya Headquarters (disambiguation)
- Khatam al-Anbia Air Defense Academy, Iranian military academy
- Khatam Al-Nabieen University, university in Kabul, Afghanistan
