= Pol-e-Choobi Synagogue =

Synagogue in Tehran, Iran

- Location of the synagogue in Tehran

Religion
- Affiliation: Judaism
- Ecclesiastical or organizational status: Synagogue
- Status: Active

Location
- Location: Sepah Square, Tehran
- Country: Iran
- Interactive map of Pol-e-Choobi Synagogue
- Coordinates: 35°42′05″N 51°26′14″E

The Pol-e-Choobi Synagogue (Persian: کنیسه پل چوبی), or Talmood Torah Synagogue (Persian: کنیسه تلمود تورات), is a Jewish congregation and synagogue, located near Sepah Square in Tehran, Iran.

== See also ==
- History of the Jews in Iran
- List of synagogues in Iran
