= Ezra Yaghoub Synagogue =

Synagogue in Tehran, Iran

- Persian: کنیسه عزرا یعقوب
- Location of the synagogue in Tehran

Religion
- Affiliation: Judaism
- Ecclesiastical or organizational status: Synagogue
- Status: Active

Location
- Location: Oudlajan, Tehran
- Country: Iran
- Interactive map of Ezra Yaghoub Synagogue
- Coordinates: 35°41′3.75″N 51°25′44.95″E

Architecture
- Type: Synagogue architecture
- Style: Qajar style
- Funded by: Ezra Yaghoub
- Established: c. 1894 (as a congregation)
- Completed: 1895

Specifications
- Capacity: c. 200 worshippers
- Site area: 524 square metres (5,640 sq ft)

The Ezra Yaghoub Synagogue (Persian: کنیسه عزرا یعقوب) is a synagogue, located in the Old Jewish Quarter, in the Oudlajan neighborhood of Tehran, Iran. Completed in 1895, the synagogue is one of oldest synagogues in Tehran.

== History ==
The synagogue was established during the reign of Naser al-Din Shah Qajar and has been repaired and restored many times since then. It was completed in 1894–1895 AD (1273 SH) on a 524-square-metre (5,640 sq ft) site. Ezra Yaghoub, for whom the synagogue is named, was a prominent Iranian Jewish merchant and was the first person to make business contact with the city of Manchester in England. After his death, aged forty, his widow spent most of his fortune on charity for the Iranian Jews.

The building was placed on the list of historic buildings in the Cultural Heritage, Handcrafts and Tourism Organization since 2004–2005 AD (1383 SH). At its peak, the synagogue would have accommodated approximately 200 worshippers.

In 2019, several antique Torah scrolls were stolen from the synagogue.

== See also ==
- History of the Jews in Iran
- List of synagogues in Iran
