= Danial Synagogue =

Orthodox synagogue in Tehran, Iran

- Persian: کنیسه دانیال
- Location of the synagogue in Tehran

Religion
- Affiliation: Orthodox Judaism
- Rite: Nusach Ashkenaz
- Ecclesiastical or organizational status: Synagogue
- Status: Active

Location
- Location: 30 Tir Street, Tehran, Central District (Tehran County)
- Country: Iran
- Interactive map of Danial Synagogue
- Coordinates: 35°41′34.26″N 51°24′47.44″E

The Danial Synagogue (Persian: کنیسه دانیال) or Daniel Synagogue (Persian: کنیسه دانیل) also known as Polish Synagogue (Persian: کنیسه لهستانی‌ها, romanized: Kenise Lahestāni-hā) is an Orthodox Jewish congregation and synagogue, located at 30 Tir Street (formerly known as Ghavam Al Saltaneh Street), in Tehran, in the Central District of Tehran County, in Iran. It is the only Ashkenazi synagogue in Iran.

It was mainly used during the time of the Second World War by Polish Jewish refugees. With the increase in Jewish refugees from Poland in 1940, Iranian Jews decided to build a specific Ashkenazi synagogue next to the Haim Synagogue.

When the Danial Synagogue was first opened it could hold sixty people. Three Ashkenazi-designed Torahs had been brought from Poland and were used in the synagogue. After the Iranian Revolution, most Ashkenazi Jews left Iran, so the synagogue is now mainly used by Iranian Jews.

== See also ==
- History of the Jews in Iran
- List of synagogues in Iran
- Polish refugees in Iran
