= Haim Synagogue =

Synagogue in Tehran, Iran

- Persian: کنیسه حییم; Hebrew: בית הכנסת חַיִּים
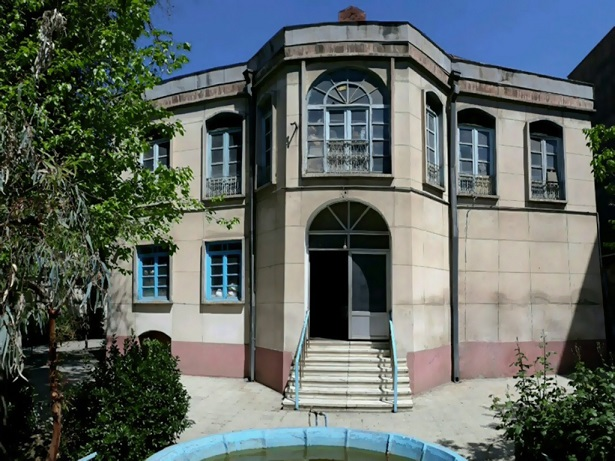
- The synagogue entrance in 2017

- Location of the synagogue in Tehran

Religion
- Affiliation: Judaism
- Ecclesiastical or organizational status: Synagogue
- Status: Limited activity

Location
- Location: 30 Tir Street, Old Jewish Quarter, Tehran, 12 (Park-e Shahr)
- Country: Iran
- Interactive map of Haim Synagogue
- Coordinates: 35°41′34″N 51°24′48″E

Architecture
- Architect: Azizollah Banayan
- Type: Synagogue architecture
- Style: Qajar period
- Funded by: Eshagh Sedgh; Eshagh Moradoff
- Completed: 1913

The Haim Synagogue (Persian: کنیسه حییم, romanized: Kenisā-ye Hayim; Hebrew: בית הכנסת חַיִּים) is a synagogue at 30 Tir Street, formerly known as Qavam-os-Saltane, in central Tehran, Iran.

As of February 2016, the synagogue was opened only on the occasions of Shabbat and the High Holy Days, due mainly to emigration and decline in membership.

== History ==
The Haim Synagogue was built following the Iranian Constitutional Revolution in 1913, under the reign of Ahmad Shah Qajar, by two Iranian Jewish residents Eshagh Sedgh and Eshagh Moradoff. It has often been considered the first urban synagogue in Iran. Prior to its construction, most synagogues in Iran were built in ghettos.

The building was designed by Azizollah Banayan, the only Jewish architect at the time.

=== World War II ===
By the time of World War II, the Haim Synagogue hosted a number of Polish Jewish refugees. After an increase in the number of Polish Jewish refugees, the Ashkenazi Danial Synagogue was built near the Haim Synagogue in 1940.

=== Operation Ezra and Nehemiah ===
In the 1950s, the Haim Synagogue was used as a refugee camp to host a number of Iraqi Jewish refugees, who immigrated to Israel via Iran as part of Operation Ezra and Nehemiah.

== Gallery ==
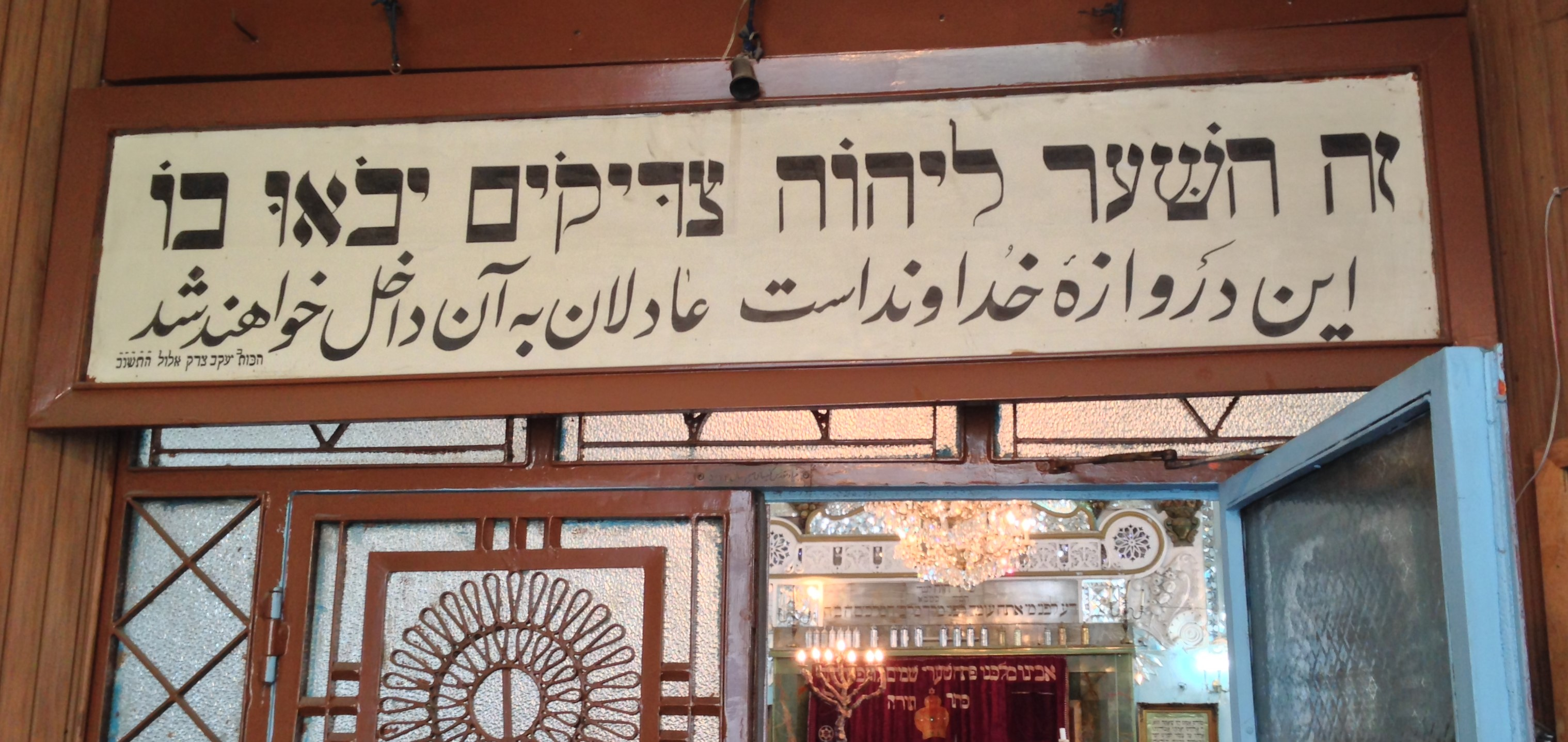
A panel in the synagogue, reading "this is the God's gate; the righteous will enter it" (Psalm 118:20).

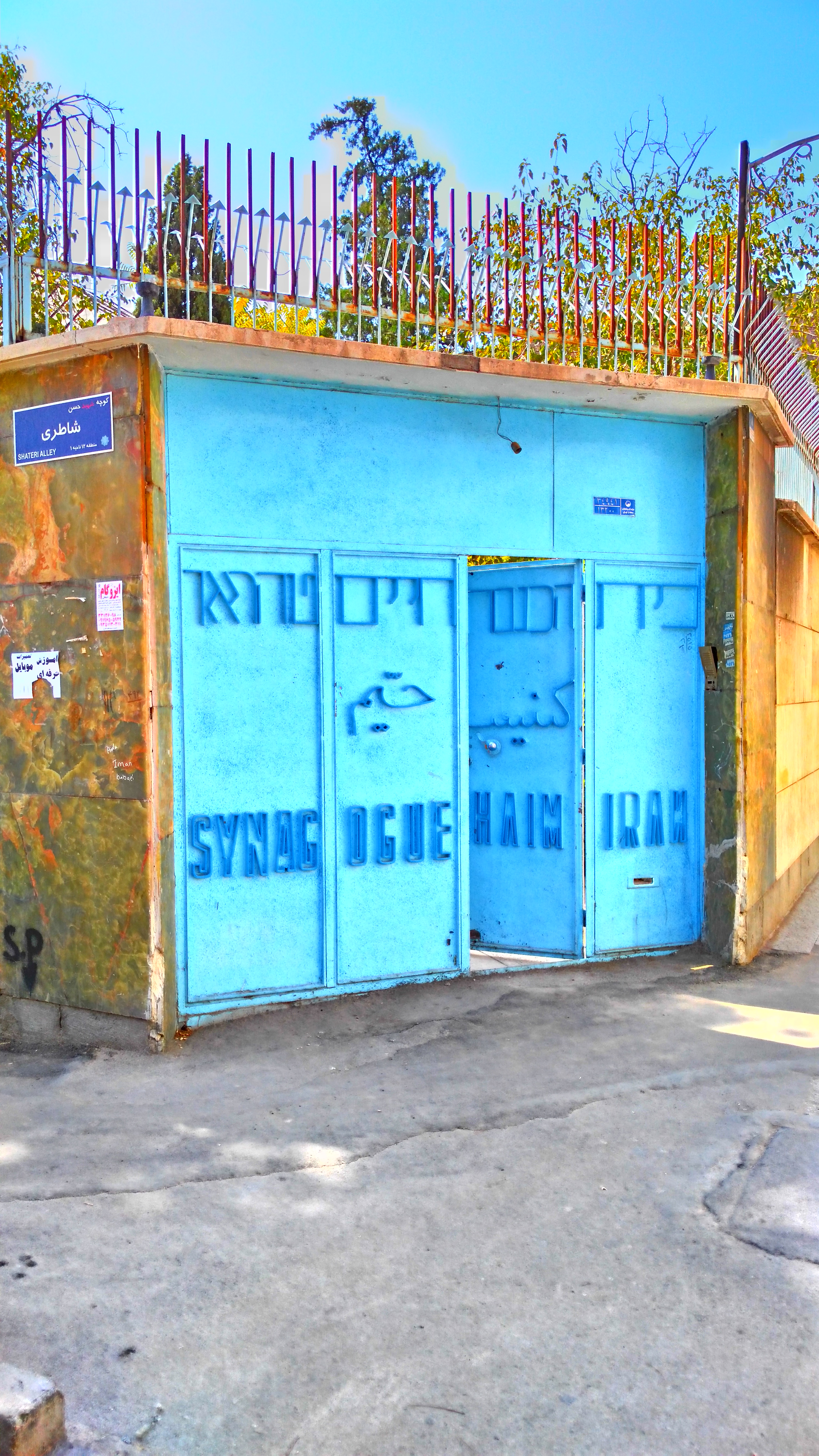
Entrance of the yard.

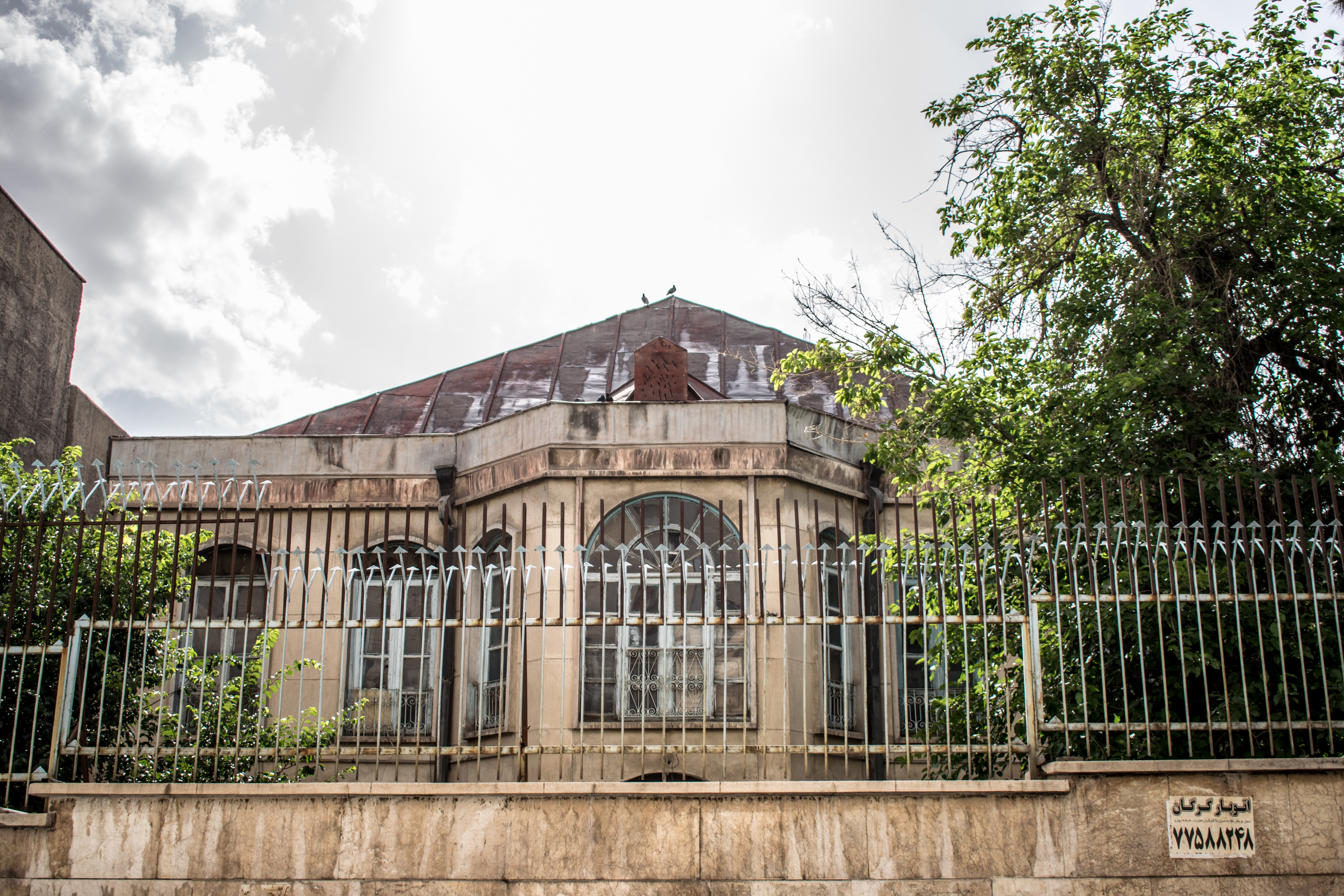
Haim Synagogue from the outside.

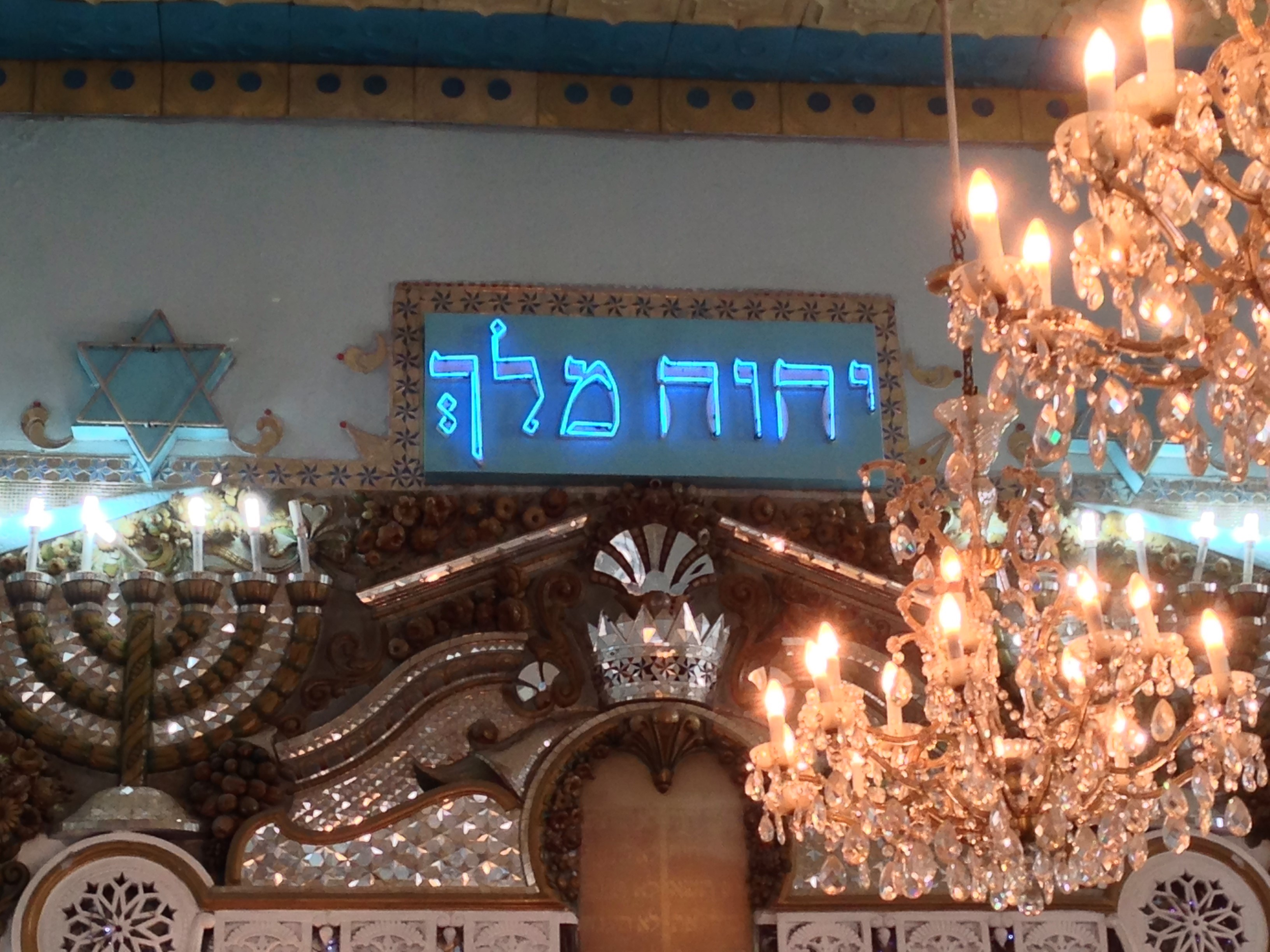
Detail of the synagogue's bema.

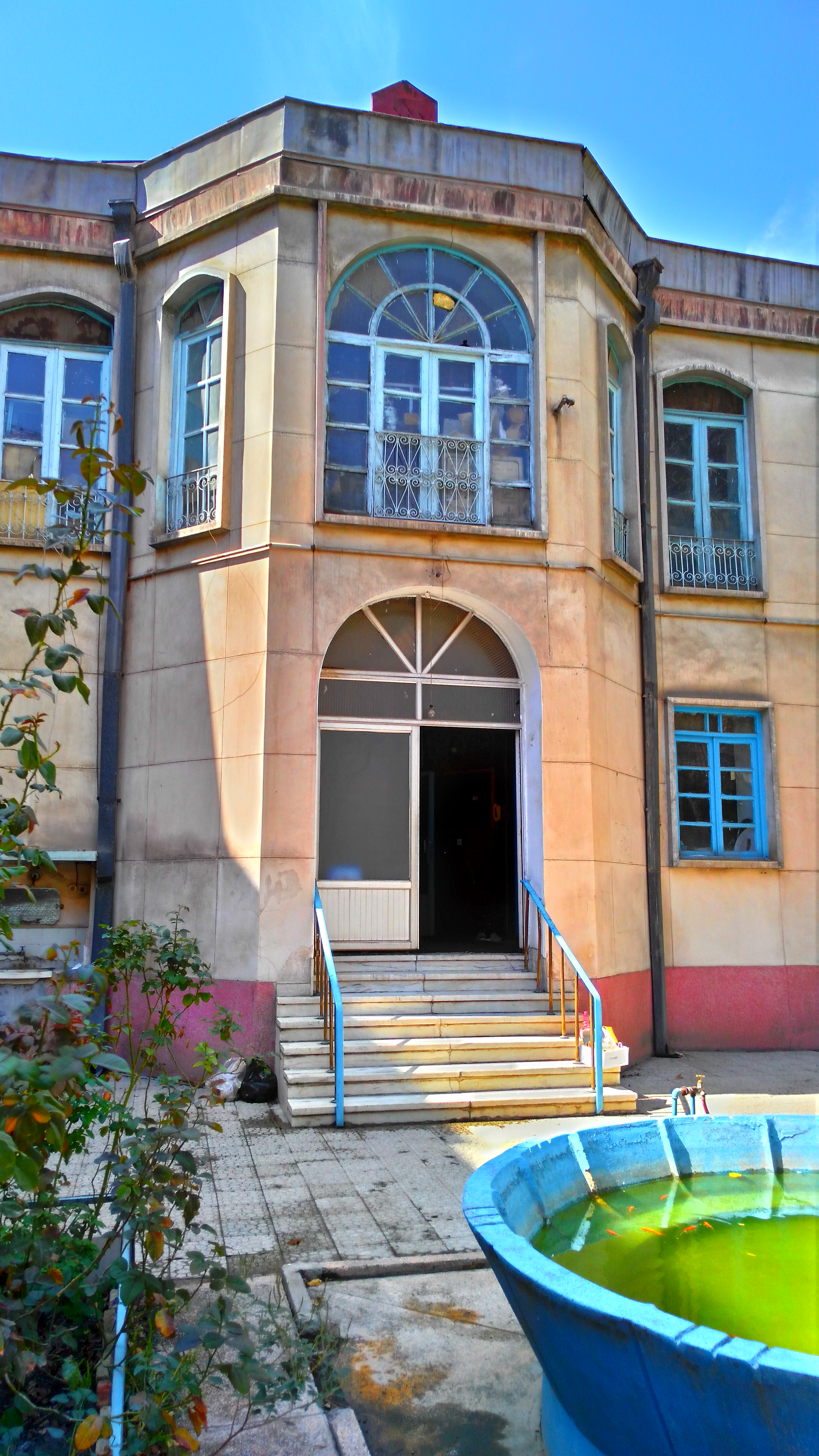

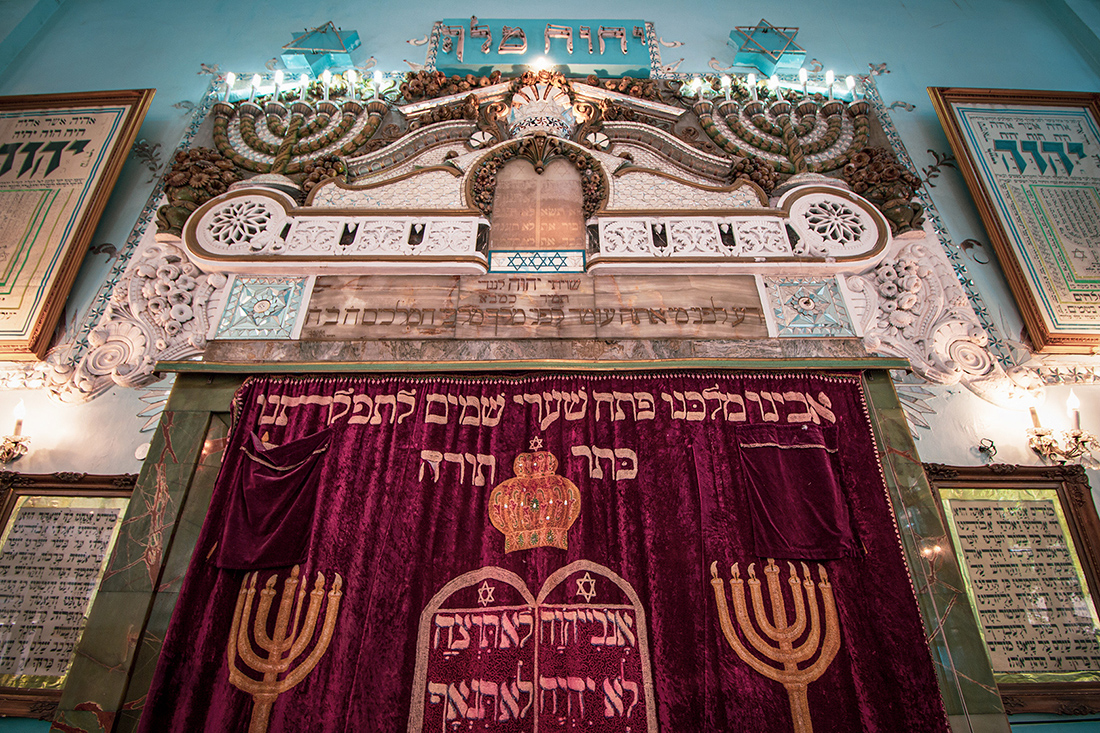
Synagogue detail

== See also ==
- History of the Jews in Iran
- List of synagogues in Iran
