= Ettefagh Synagogue =

Synagogue in Tehran, Iran

- کنیسه اتفاق
- Location of the synagogue in Tehran

Religion
- Affiliation: Judaism
- Ecclesiastical or organizational status: Synagogue
- Status: Active

Location
- Location: Ghods Street, Tehran, Central District, Tehran County
- Country: Iran
- Interactive map of Ettefagh Synagogue
- Coordinates: 35°42′16″N 51°23′50″E

Architecture
- Type: Synagogue architecture
- Style: Pahlavi
- Founder: Meir Abdullah Batson
- Established: 1946 (as a congregation)
- Site area: 865 square metres (9,310 sq ft)

The Ettefagh Synagogue (Persian: کنیسه اتفاق) is a Jewish congregation and synagogue, located on Ghods Street, in Tehran, in the Central District of Tehran County, in Iran.

== History ==
After World War II, with the installation of a new government in Iraq, the situation of the Jews in Iraq deteriorated. After prominent members of the Jewish community such as Laura Khozoee were arrested, and Shafiq Ades, a successful Jewish businessman, was hanged, many Iraqi Jews decided to emigrate. Some left for Israel while others decided to settle in Iran. They reached Iran with the help of Kurdish Jews and many arrived at Khorramshahr. With the help of Harun Abdolnabi, a prominent Jew in Khorramshahr, some were able to go to Tehran and obtain legal documents. From 1946 to 1951, many Iraqi Jews moved to Tehran, while others moved to Europe and the United States. At this time, with the help of Iranian Jews, Iraqi Jews decided to create a cultural center.

In 1946, Meir Abdullah Batson bought over 0.5 hectares (1.2 acres) of land near the University of Tehran, in Ghods Street. He separated a piece of land of over 865 square metres (9,310 sq ft) and turned it into a synagogue, with the help of Saleh and Davood Mashi, Heskel Haim, and others. The community wanted to name the synagogue after Meir Abdullah, but the government did not accept it because he was a foreign citizen. In Persian, beh ettefagh means "together". Hence the name "Ettefagh" was chosen, and it became the main place of gathering for the Iraqi Jews of Tehran.

The synagogue was designed in the Pahlavi architectural style, and it was fitted with the most advanced cooling system of the time. Most of the Torah scrolls in the synagogue were brought by the Jews who came from Iraq, and a Babylonian Talmud in Aramaic script was dedicated to the synagogue. Many Iraqi Jews emigrated from Iran following the 1979 Iranian Revolution, and today only a few families (mainly Iranian Jews) still use the synagogue. A fundraising campaign organised by the Babylonian Jewish Center of New York enabled repairs and upkeep of the synagogues.

== Ettefagh School ==
The synagogue also had a related private high school, the Ettefagh School. In the 1970s, the school was known for its strong English-language coursework. Students from religious minority families in Iran attended the school in the 1970s, including Christians, Baha'is, and Zoroastrians. Following the Iranian Revolution the school has been run by the state and is for girls only.

== See also ==
- History of the Jews in Iran
- List of synagogues in Iran
