= Abrishami Synagogue =

Synagogue in Tehran, Iran

- Hebrew: בית הכנסת אברישמי; Persian: كنيسهء ابريشمى
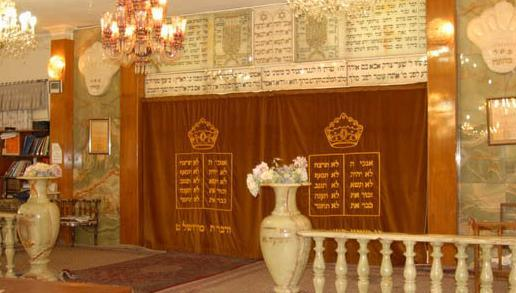
- The synagogue interior, in 2009

- Location of the synagogue in Tehran

Religion
- Affiliation: Judaism
- Ecclesiastical or organizational status: Synagogue
- Leadership: Chief Rabbi Yehuda Gerami
- Status: Active

Location
- Location: North Palestine Street, Kakh Shomali, Tehran, Central District (Tehran County)
- Country: Iran
- Interactive map of Abrishami Synagogue
- Coordinates: 35°42′44″N 51°24′14″E

Architecture
- Type: Synagogue architecture
- Style: Modernist; Pahlavi
- Funded by: Aghajan Abrishami
- Completed: 1965; 2024 (renovations)

Specifications
- Capacity: 500 worshippers
- Site area: 1,025 m^{2} (11,030 sq ft)

The Abrishami Synagogue (Persian: كنيسهء ابريشمى, romanized: Kanise ye Abrishami; Hebrew: בית הכנסת אברישמי) is a synagogue, located in the Kakh Shomali neighborhood of Tehran, Iran. The synagogue is situated within a compound that also includes a Jewish school, a beit midrash, a mikveh, and a kosher restaurant.

== History ==
The synagogue was completed in September 1965 in the upper-middle-class neighborhood of Kakh Shomali (currently North Palestine Street). The land on which the compound was built was granted by the Iranian Jewish philanthropist, Aghajan Abrishami and is 1,025 m^{2} (11,030 sq ft) in area. A foundation was originally created by the name of Tzedek Cultural Foundation whose mission was to oversee the building and operations of the synagogue and school.

The compound consists of two floors. The first floor is a school and the second floor houses the synagogue. The building was constructed in a Modernist Pahlavi 1960s architectural style, with its exterior and interior design and layout influenced by local Persian architectural styles for religious buildings. The inside is luxuriously decorated with glass chandeliers and rich fabrics with gold embroidery. The compound was significantly renovated and expanded during 2023 and 2024.

Abrishami Synagogue serves as the social and cultural center of the Jewish community of Tehran and is administered directly by the Chief Rabbi of Iran.

== Gallery ==
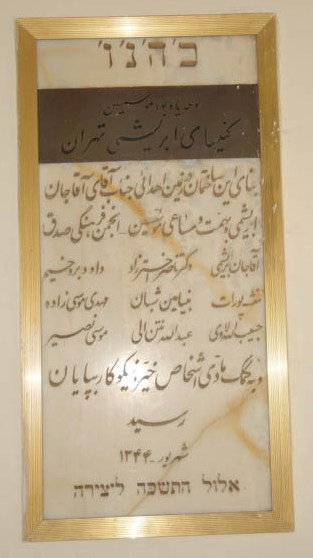
The foundation tablet compound. (Note: The tablet credits the members of the Tzedek Cultural Foundation with the vision to build the compound. The inscription on the brown section reads: "Memorial Tablet of the Abrishami Synagogue, Tehran, Iran." It was placed after the Islamic revolution of 1979 to cover the original inscription on the tablet which gave praises to the Shah, Mohammed Reza Pahlavi as was customary in public-use buildings built during his reign. The founding members of the foundation were: Aghajan Abrishami, Nasser Akhtarzad, David Berukhim, Menashe Purat, Benjamin Shaban, Mehdi Musazadeh, Habib Lavi, (Hacham) Abdollah Netan Eli and Musa Nassir.)

== See also ==
- History of the Jews in Iran
- List of synagogues in Iran
