= Amir Abad =

Neighbourhood in Tehran, Iran

Coordinates: 35°44′13″N 51°23′39″E

Amir Abad (Persian: امیرآباد) is a district in the city of Tehran, Iran.

The long main street of Amir Abad is called Kargar Street and extends from Southern Tehran's Rah Ahan Square to Northern Amir Abad.

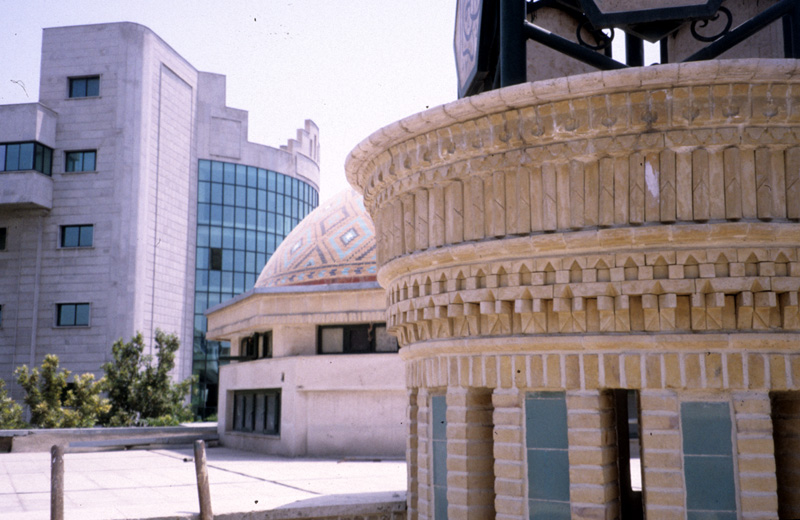
Shariati hospital, in Amir Abad district of Tehran is a large medical center of the city.

The Atomic Energy Organization of Iran is headquartered north of this district. The University of Tehran has large parts of its engineering, economics, physics departments, and physical education facilities, as well as most of its student dormitories.

Laleh Park is in the middle of North Kargar Street. Shariati Hospital is also located on this street.
