= Khorasaniha Synagogue =

Synagogue in Tehran, Iran

- Hebrew: בית הכנסת ח'וראסאניה
- Location of the synagogue in Tehran

Religion
- Affiliation: Judaism
- Ecclesiastical or organizational status: Synagogue
- Status: Active

Location
- Location: Zartosht and Valiasr Streets, Tehran
- Country: Iran
- Interactive map of Khorasaniha Synagogue
- Coordinates: 35°43′00″N 51°24′18″E

Architecture
- Type: Synagogue architecture
- Style: Pahlavi
- Established: 1970 (as a congregation)
- Completed: 1971

Specifications
- Capacity: 400 worshippers
- Site area: 840 square metres (9,000 sq ft)
- Materials: Brick; stained glass

The Khorasaniha Synagogue (Hebrew: בית הכנסת ח'וראסאניה) is a Jewish congregation and synagogue, located at the junction of Zartosht and Valiasr Streets in Tehran, Iran. The synagogue was partially destroyed following an Israeli airstrike on April 7, 2026.

== History ==
In 1349 SH (1970–1971 AD) Jews from Mashhad often used the Levian Synagogue. However, with an increase in Mashhadi Jewish population, the need for a separate synagogue increased. With the help of several other synagogues such as Levian, Yousefzadeh, and Rafie Nia, the land was purchased. The building is constructed on 840 square metres (9,000 sq ft) of land and contains four floors with a capacity of up to 400 people. Rabbi Eliahu ben Haim has been the chief Rabbi of the synagogue for many years.

== See also ==
- History of the Jews in Iran
- List of synagogues in Iran
