= Humayun (disambiguation) =

Humayun (1508–1556) was a Mughal Emperor.

- The Humayunnama is a work written by Gulbadan Begum about her brother, the Mughal emperor Humayun.

Hamayoun, Hamayun, Homayoun, Homayun, Humayoun and Humayun (Persian: همايون) may also refer to:

- Humayun Khan (disambiguation)
- Hakim Humam (died 1595), Mughal official, originally known as Humayun
- Humayun (film), a 1945 Indian film about the emperor
- Humayun (mode), a dastāh of Persian music
- Humayun (name), list of people with the name
- Dîvân-ı Hümâyûn, the Imperial Council (Ottoman Empire)
- Homayun (actor) (1937–2025), Iranian actor

== Places ==
- Afghanistan
  - Hamayun, Afghanistan
- Iran
  - Homayun, Kurdistan
  - Homayun, South Khorasan
  - Homayun, Zanjan

== See also ==
- Homayoun, a given name and surname
