= Afghan name =

An Afghan personal name consists of a given name (Dari: نام, Pashto: نوم) and sometimes a surname at the end. Personal names are generally not divided into first and family names; a single name is recognized as a full personal name, and the addition of further components – such as additional given names, regional, or ethnic family/clan names or patronymics – is often a matter of parents' choice. This structure is shared amongst the different ethnicities of Afghanistan and people of Khyber Pakhtunkhwa.

== Given names ==
Traditionally, Afghans only use a first name and lack a last name. This is also the case among Pashtuns in neighbouring Pakistan. Those having only a first name may be distinguished by tribe, place of birth, profession or honorific title. It is generally those from developing regions who are known by a mononym due to the lack of a legal identification system. They may also have multiple mononyms (i.e. may be called by multiple personal names).

=== Males ===
Male names are normally compounded, for example Ahmad Khan, in which two words make up one single given name.

Men often have Islamic names derived from Arabic that are popular throughout the Muslim world, whereas women more commonly have names from local Pashto or Persian origin, which itself can have derivations from various Indo-Iranian languages such as Sanskrit.

Male first names very often have two parts, usually the "proper" name and the "subordinate" name. For example:

- The full name Mohammad Zaman, which consists of the subordinate name Mohammad and the proper name Zaman.
- The full name Ghulam Hazrat, which consists of the subordinate name Hazrat and the proper name Ghulam.

This is not always the case, and sometimes both parts are combined as one, for example:

- The full name Abdul Ali
- The full name Din Mohammad

In rare cases, a male first name only has a single part, for example the full name Farid, or the full name Homayoun.

Below is a list of assorted Afghan given names of local Pashto or Persian origin or otherwise of Indo-Persian origin.

Name	Transliteration	Translation
قادر	Qader	Lower class name
رسول	Rasol	Lower class name
اېمل	Aimal	Friend
ارمان	Arman	Hope
ببرک	Babrak	
داوود	Daud or Dawud	Beloved; famed; loved
فرزاد	Farzad	
ګلزار	Gulzar	Flower garden
حبيب	Habib	Beloved
حافظ	Hafez	The memoriser
حامد	Hamid	One who praises; praise-worthy
همایون	Humayun	
لمر	Lemar	Sun
ميرويس	Mirwais	
اُمید	Omid	Hope
پېمان	Paiman	Promise
رنګين	Rangeen	Colored
سهراب	Sohrab	(Symbol of Filicide, as he was killed by his own father)
سرباز	Sarbaz	Eagle
شاپور	Shahpur	Son of a king
شازر	Shahzar	King of gold
سپېڅلې	Spetselai	Pious
تعبان	Taban	Bright moonlight
وېس	Wais	
يمه	Yama	Old lord
زلمې	Zalmay	Young
زيار	Zakaria	God has remembered
زرمست	Zarmast	Gold excitement

=== Females ===
Female first names tend to have a single component, for example Fereyba, Laila, or Roya. In rarer instances they may have two parts, for example Gol Khanom. Female names of Arabic origin are less common than Arabic male names; some examples are: Jamila, Nadia or Zahra.

The table below shows a list of assorted female names of Pashto or Persian origin (or otherwise of Indo-Persian origin), with many referring to beauty and nature.

Name	Transliteration	Translation
	Nasrin	jonquil
آناهیتا	Anahita	(name of ancient goddess)
	Fereyba	
فرشته	Freshta / Farishta	angel
فوزیه	Fawzia	
کونتره	Kawtara / Kontara	pigeon
	Spogmay / Spozhmay	moon
	Rodaba	(character from Shahnama)
	Aria	
اريانه	Ariana / Aryana	(see Ariana)
	Khatera	
هليه	Hila	hope
	Manizha	
مرجان	Marjan	
مينه	Mina	love, azure
فروزان	Forozan	shining
ملالئ	Malala / Malalai	melancholic (also refers to Malalai of Maiwand)
نغمه	Naghma	melody
نازو	Nazo	handsome (also refers to famous Pashto poetess Nazo Tokhi)
پریسا	Parisa	fairy-like
پلوشه	Palwasha	light ray (of the) moon
	Roya	
واورينه	Wawrina	snow white
یلدا	Yalda	(named after Yaldā Night)
زېتونه	Zaituna	olive
زرينه	Zareena	golden
زهل	Zohal	moon (of) another planet

=== Neutral names ===
Examples of gender-neutral Afghan names include: Gul (meaning "flower"), Lal, Sultan, Taj, and Shaista.

== Last names ==
While most Afghans lack a last name, they are more common among urban populations or the educated or higher class. Last names can represent a father's name, tribal affiliation, or an adjective describing the person. Thus, in some cases, people of the same family may have different last names. Common suffices of last names referring to tribal affiliation are:

- -ai or -i, usually added to the area of origin, for example Karzai (from Karz, Kandahar), Marghai, Kohistani or Hussaini
- -zai or -zoy, meaning "son" in Pashto, for example Ghilzai, Popalzai or Yusufzai.
- -khel / khil (in Pashto), meaning "branch", for example Suleimankhel or Omarkhil
- (containing) -gul, for example Gulbaz

Tribal names are usually patrilineal. The ancestral line of women generally is not included as part of the identity. Afghan women traditionally do not take their husband's surnames when they marry.

Other known suffixes include:

- -ullah, referring to Allah, for example Rahmatullah or Hafizullah
- -uddin, for example Shamsuddin or Ghawsuddin
- -zada / zadah, meaning "son of" in Persian, for example Khanzada or Shahzada
- -bakhsh, "granted by"
- '-dad, "given by", for example Baridad

Among ethnic Pashtuns, surnames based on location are not common. For most of their history, Pashtuns have lived a rural, transhumant, semi-nomadic life and therefore surnames tied to cities or locations are rare. Some tribes identify with locations, such as the Khostwal and Khost, or the Bannuchis and Bannu in Pakistan.

Surnames may also be derived from honorifics, for example Khan which was adopted via cross-cultural exchanges between Turko-Mongol peoples.

== Honorifics ==
Honorifics are also given to some people, for example Khan which is used for men's names, or Jan used for both men's and women's names. For example:

- Sharif Khan, Latif Khan, Khalil Jan for men
- Sharifa Jan, Latifa Jan for women

Honorific names can signify certain ranks of notability such as royal, religious or occupational status. Below are some examples:

- Agha - sir, mister; a general term of respect
- Khan - served at one time as a title for an honored person
- Mullah - Muslim cleric
- Mawlawi - Muslim cleric
- Ustad - a master craftsperson, lecturer or a person who is the master of a profession
- Ghazi - military-related
- Dagarwal - military-related
- Sayyid and sharif - honorific titles given to men accepted as descendants of Muhammad
- Sardar
- Khwaja - "lord"
- Akhund - Muslim scholar
- Shah - "king"
- Engineer - someone with the said profession

== Addressing ==
=== Titles and honorifics ===
Some honorifics are used in addressing people in place of their actual given name, such as Mullah or Doctor. Patronymic names are also sometimes used in addressing people, for example dokhtare Golbibi meaning "daughter of Golbibi". They can also be used for the person's father's title, for example bache rayis meaning "son of the President".

=== Nicknames ===
Nicknames are sometimes used to address someone; the most common are those related to beauty, nature or a brave animal. Examples include:

- Ezmaray, meaning "lion"
- Sheragha, meaning "master of the lion"
- Golagha, meaning "master of the flower"
- Setara (Dari) or Storay (Pashto), meaning "star"
- Ghotay meaning "plant"

=== Diminutives ===
Used for close friends or children, these are often shorter forms of given names with an -o suffix, for example:

- Najmudin > Najo
- Khalil > Khalo

Another suffix is -ak or -gak, strictly used only in addressing someone directly. For example bachagak meaning "little boy", or dokhtarak meaning little girl.

=== Kinship names ===
Dari	Pashto	Translation
Mādar	Mōr	Mother
Padar	Plār	Father
Barādar	Wror	Brother
Khāhar, Khwār, Khwāhar	Khor	Sister
Zan, Khānom	Arteena	Wife
Shawar, shuy	Mera	Husband
Dokhtar	Loor	Daughter; girl
Pesar, Bacha	Zowi	Son; boy
Bacha, Kodak, Awlād	Awlād, Bacha	Child
Hamsar		Spouse
Māmāi	Khalu	Uncle (maternal)
Kākā, amu		Uncle (paternal)
Khāla		Aunt (maternal)
Ama		Aunt (paternal)

== Transcription and international usage ==
Since there is no orthographic standardization, and because there are diverse dialects, there are many discrepancies in transcription of Afghan names into English, especially from Pashto. The second component of male names (for example the Khan in Gul Khan) is generally treated as a last name in the West, despite Khan originally being a honorific title. In an English-speaking country it would be treated as a last name, with Gul the first or middle name, in this case.

The lack of standardization means that English renderings can also vary, for example the name مسعود can be variously transcribed as Massoud, Masoud, or Mas'ud. Interposition of spaces can also vary; for example, both Miakhel and Mia Khel have been used as transliterations of the same name.

Afghans who have a "proper" name before the "subordinate" (for example, the Zaman in Mohamad Zaman Naderi) would likely abbreviate the first component when transcribing the full name in English - in this case, for example, M. Zaman Naderi - or adopt it as a middle name, as: Zaman M. Naderi.

"Pathan" is used as a surname in Pashtun communities living in the Indian subcontinent, because they are known as Pathans or Pashtuns to their neighbouring communities, so they simplify it as a surname rather than their tribal name.

== See also ==
- Iranian name
- Culture of Afghanistan
- Pashtun culture
