= Siyamak More Sedgh =

Jewish Iranian politician and doctor

Doctor Siyamak More Sedgh سیامک مره‌صدق

Member of the Islamic Consultative Assembly for Jews
- In office 2008–2020
- Preceded by: Maurice Motamed
- Succeeded by: Homayoun Sameh

Personal details
- Born: 1965 (age 60–61) Shiraz, Fars Province, Pahlavi Iran
- Spouse: Tina Rabie-Zadeh

Military service
- Battles/wars: Iran–Iraq War

Siyamak More Sedgh (Note: Given name also transliterated as Siamak, Ciamak, or Seyamak; surname also transliterated as Moreh-Sedegh, Moreh-Sedgh, Morsadegh, Morsathegh, Mareh Sedgh, Merh Sedgh, or Mereh Sedgh.) (Persian: سیامک مره‌صدق, romanized: Siyāmak More-Sedq, Hebrew: סיאמך מורה-צדק; born 1965) is a Jewish Iranian politician and doctor who was the holder of the Iranian Parliament's reserved seat for the Jewish minority from 2008 to 2020, and is also the chairman of the Jewish charitable institution Dr. Sapir Hospital and Charity Center. He has been referred to as Iran's "No. 1 Jew."

In his political capacity, More Sedgh has made efforts to improve the position of Jews in Iranian law and society, such as by allowing Jewish children in public schools to not go to school on Saturdays. He supports gradual reforms within the current Islamist framework. In foreign policy, he has repeatedly criticized Israel, which he has dubbed the "Zionist regime". He supported the 2015 Iran nuclear deal. A trained surgeon, he has referred to his work as a doctor at Dr. Sapir Hospital as his "first passion" and his "duty as a human being".

== Personal life and medical career ==
More Sedgh was born in Shiraz in 1965 to a prominent family who had led the local Jewish community since the Safavid era. In 1983, he was accepted by the Shiraz School of Medicine. During the Iran-Iraq War of 1980 to 1988, he served as a first aid doctor. In a 2010 interview with Russia Today, More Sedgh stated that he had volunteered in the war for twelve months, but in a 2013 interview with CNN, he stated he had volunteered for "more than eighty months".

In 1990, More Sedgh received a Doctor of Medicine degree in General Surgery, summa cum laude. He worked as a general surgical assistant at Namazi Hospital after graduation and was employed beginning in 1995 as an assistant professor at the Kurdistan University of Medical Sciences in the western city of Sanandaj. He was put in charge of Kurdistan's emergency center in 2000 before moving to the capital of Tehran in 2002, to serve as the chairman of the Jewish charitable institution Dr. Sapir Hospital and Charity Center. More Sedgh continues to direct the hospital concurrently with his political work. Although he has admitted that balancing the two occupations has been difficult, he said in a 2018 interview with Al Jazeera English that:

Going to the parliament for me is a duty for my country and the Iranian Jews. My work in this hospital is my duty as a human being.

Although Dr. Sapir Hospital is located in a traditionally Jewish quarter of Tehran, most Jewish people have since left and the vast majority of patients and staff are Muslims. Noting this fact in a 2017 interview with Deutsche Welle, More Sedgh stated that his "closest friends" are Muslim.

While at Sanandaj, More Sedgh served as the hazzan or cantor at the local synagogue. In 2006, he became the chairman of the Tehran Jewish Committee, a post which he held until deciding to run for Parliament in 2008. Since 2009, he has also been the editor-in-chief of Ofogh-e Binah, a monthly newspaper published by the committee.

More Sedgh's wife immigrated to the United States in the late 1990s; he chose to remain in Iran because he did not think he could live outside his native Iranian culture. In 2002, he married Tina Rabie-Zadeh.

== Political career and statements ==
In the 2008 Iranian legislative election, More Sedgh was elected to the reserved seat for Jews in the Iranian Parliament. He successfully defended his seat in the next two elections. In the 2020 legislative election, he was not re-elected.

Electoral history of Siyamak More Sedgh
Election	Votes cast	Votes for More Sedgh	Percentage
2008	2,748	2,374	86.39%
2012	3,934	3,240	82.36%
2016	3,397	2,449	72.09%

From 2016 to 2020, his parliamentary committee was the Health and Medicare Committee. He was also a member of the parliamentary Friendship Groups for Australia, Indonesia, Malaysia, New Zealand, and Singapore. More Sedgh's political stances diverge only narrowly from established Iranian state policies.

=== Internal policies ===
According to 7Dorim, a website discussing Jewish culture in Iran, More Sedgh "has complained on many occasions against the biased position of the Iranian TV and Radio... which had broadcast some negative propaganda and insulting programs" with regards to Jews. In several interviews with foreign media, he has stated that the situation for Jews in Iran is not perfect but improving. In a 2013 interview with CNN's Fareed Zakaria, More Sedgh said:

Of course, being a Jewish minority in a religious country have some problems. But after the revolution, our problems are being solved step by step. Today, our condition is better than yesterday. And today, our condition is much better than 10 years or 20 years ago.

More Sedgh has pointed to changes in compensation payments for deaths, which used to be different for Muslims and non-Muslims but have since become equal, as an example of improving Jewish lives. In the 2017 Deutsche Welle interview, he counted the fact that Jewish children enrolled in public schools were now allowed to stay home on Saturday, the Sabbath, as "one of our [Jewish community's] biggest successes of the past years". He also obtained a 50% increase in the budget allotted to the activities of religious minorities. More Sedgh is making efforts to allow Jews to be enrolled as officers in the army and hopes that Jews will one day be allowed to serve as judges and in the Cabinet of Iran.

More Sedgh supports a strategy of making improvements "little by little, step by step". According to 7Dorim, he believes that all current problems that Jews face in Iran can be solved without deviating from the current Islamist constitution. He has stated that "for religious freedom, Iran is one of the freest countries". More Sedgh has also emphasized that Jews are part of the Iranian nation.

With regards to the Holocaust denial controversy of Iranian President Mahmoud Ahmadinejad, More Sedgh has argued that Ahmadinejad did not deny the Holocaust but only questioned it, and that this was a personal view of the president rather than an official Iranian statement. However, he added that "I do not even accept questioning it. It doesn't make sense to question things that are completely clear and accepted worldwide." In an interview with the Israeli newspaper The Jerusalem Post, he compared Holocaust denial to "denying life, denying that the sun exists". More Sedgh wrote a letter to Ahmadinejad criticizing him for questioning the Holocaust.

=== Foreign policy ===
More Sedgh has repeatedly criticized Israel. In 2007, he referred to reports of the aliyah of forty Iranian Jews to Israel as an unconfirmed "misinformation campaign." In 2008, his first year in the legislature, he refused to celebrate Israel's sixtieth anniversary and stated that Israel showed "anti-human behavior" towards Palestinians in Gaza. During the 2014 Gaza War, More Sedgh compared Israel's treatment of Palestinians to the policies of the Nazis and of Saddam Hussein and dubbed the country the "Zionist regime". Most recently, on the 2020 International Quds Day, More Sedgh stated that "the Zionist regime seeks to abuse the Jewish religion and has no adherence to the principles of this religion" and suggested that "the Jews of the world [should] rise up against a disaster like Zionism and declare their disgust," just as Muslims express their disgust for "people like bin Laden." When asked about Israel's right to exist, he stated that "every country that goes in a human rights behavior has the right to exist."

In the Jerusalem Post interview, More Sedgh stated that Iran had no interest in an offensive war against Israel:

I think that a two-state solution, or any solution that ensures Middle East peace, will be supported by all nations. It has already been stated many times that Iran is not interested in starting a war with Israel because it knows that anyone starting a war in the Middle East is committing an act of suicide. It is a crowded part of the world, and anyone starting a war here is ending his life.

More Sedgh supported the 2015 Iran nuclear deal, noting that "the lifting of sanctions... will also positively affect the lives of Jews in Iran." As of 2018, following American president Donald Trump's unilateral withdrawal from the deal, he opposes any dialogue with the Trump administration. In 2019, he stated that Trump had "employed the most anti-Semitic people in the world in a bid to pursue his anti-Iran objectives." More Sedgh also criticized Poland for co-hosting (with the United States) the February 2019 Warsaw Conference targeting Iran, saying that the country had "the most anti-Semitic government in the world" which was "implementing some laws that deny [the] Holocaust".

In 2013, More Sedgh was one of only two Members of Parliament to accompany President Hassan Rouhani's first address to the United Nations, as part of what has been dubbed a "charm offensive" to improve Iran's global image following the various controversies of previous president Ahmadinejad. He also visited Syria and met former president of Syria Bashar al-Assad.

In 2016 Israel Radio released a tape of More Sedgh being interviewed by a French-Israeli reporter. In the tape, he said a war between Iran and Israel would be "suicide" for Iran, and he expressed doubt the Iranian government would seriously consider going to war. After the tapes were released, More Sedgh denied that the interview occurred, accusing it of fabrication. In an interview with Fars News Agency he said he would never have taken part in such an interview and that he refuses to respond to "phone calls and questions from the Zionist media because they are not the creatures that we want to answer."

== Controversies ==
More Sedgh has been criticized for promoting Iranian propaganda and whitewashing the situation of Iranian Jewry. Iranian-American journalist Karmel Melamed characterized him as a prop for the Government of Iran, which used him whenever they were accused of antisemitism, and another writer for the Times of Israel criticized media outlets for treating him as a legitimate representative of Iranian Jews, asking, "[how free] any Iranian parliamentarian (much less the token Jewish one) is to criticize Iranian policy."
