= ILAI Fund =

Israeli children's foundation

- Formation: 2005
- Founder: Albert Elay Shaltiel
- Founded at: Israel
- Type: NGO
- Registration no.: 580461085
- Purpose: Providing funds for special needs children
- Headquarters: Modiin
- Website: http://www.ilaifund.org/

The ILAI Fund is a nonsectarian fund that assists under-privileged special needs, sick, or disabled children whose families are financially unable to meet their needs. The nonprofit organization was established in Israel in 2005 by Albert Elay Shaltiel.

As of early 2022, the ILAI Fund has assisted and continues to assist over 3000 children with special needs and their families from low-income backgrounds, with special focus on single mother households regardless their ethnic or race back-round from all religions.

The recipients of the Fund's generosity are called “Heroes,” while donors are referred to as “Donating Angels.”

"a special fund to support children with special needs"

== History ==
The ILAI Fund is a recognized nonprofit organization that was founded by the Albert Shaltiel, a Jewish family man with Iranian roots.

Both Albert and Yael were born in 1969 in Tehran, Iran, in the Dr. Sapir Hospital and Charity Centre, that later became an inspiration for his own charitable activities. The couple immigrated to Israel individually and were married in the year 2000. In 2005 their son Ilai Benyamin was born. As an expression of gratitude he founded and currently direct the charity which is named for their son Ilai-Benyamin.

The fund's board is staffed entirely by volunteers.

The P.E.F. Israel Endowment Funds, Inc. approves The ILAI fund, allowing all donors to benefit from 501 (c) 3 - U.S.A tax free donations.

UK Toremet made the ILAI Fund its recipient agency, allowing tax free donations from Great Britain.

The ILAI Fund has a group of supporters from all over the world. The fund chose to title the supporters as Donating Angels because they financially and voluntarily support the ILAI Fund in its mission. They help to raise the funds needed to purchase special equipment, treatments, medication, education and many more for these special children. The ILAI Fund is also supported by various Jewish organisations such as Iranian American Jewish Federation of New York and Looking Beyond LA.

== Beneficiaries ==
The ILAI Fund beneficiaries often have severe physical, emotional and intellectual disabilities, such as blindness, deafness, autism or Down syndrome. ILAI's objective is to help those families who have financial difficulties. Most of these children are of single parents and occasionally orphans. Their target population includes victims of polio and other illnesses, cancer patients, and children afflicted by accidents, wars or terrorism.

The fund chose the title heroes for the children because they find them brave and courageous and believe that these children are the true superheroes of the ILAI Fund.

== Categories of Assistance ==
The ILAI Fund selects beneficiaries according to referrals from the social services. It provides children with a wide range of medical equipment such as wheelchairs, walkers, bath lifts, orthopedic shoes, splints and braces, diapers, eyeglasses, specialized computers, and hospital transportation costs. The fund also supplies special nutritional food, vitamins or medication that healthcare programs may not cover. The ILAI fund also arranges for physiotherapy, hydrotherapy and psychotherapy where needed. In addition, ILAI provides one-on-one caregivers and teachers. The ILAI Fund gives the children a chance to experience events that regular children take for granted, such as birthday celebrations, family outings, visits to zoos, parks and other recreational fun days. All these arrangements are possible with the help from the supporting donors.

In his interview on Feb. 2022 to the Jewish Journal writer, Debra L. Eckerling which took place due to the JEWISH DISABILITY AWARENESS, ACCEPTANCE AND INCLUSION MONTH (JDAAIM) Albert Expressed his dedication and responsibility to the ILAI Children as follows: “I am here to serve” . “And I am serving these children as I would my own child.” For Albert, everything he does and believes in relates to the organization's mission: “To fulfill God’s biggest commandment: ‘Love thy neighbor as you love thyself.’” “These children don’t have an Abba, so I want to be [their] Abba (father)”

“Believe in yourself, believe in humanity, and believe in love. Believe in Tikkun Olam. We are here to be a light unto the nations.”

== Projects ==
The ILAI Fund has projects targeting specific needs within the Israeli society. One such project is called the iCan-iPad project and its aims are to provide funds for underprivileged families with children challenged by autism or cerebral palsy. The funds are provided in order to achieve two goals: to purchase iPads with applications especially suited for the children to communicate, learn, express their feelings and needs, and to pay for ABA Therapy that helps children with autism learn to communicate and function effectively, and aids in their education.

Other projects the ILAI Fund has are:

iHear (providing funds for hearing aids),

iMove (providing funds for Hart Walkers, wheelchairs, orthopaedic shoos special lifts for cars),

iLive (providing funds for medicine, special nutrition and diapers)

iWin (providing funds for hydrotherapy, speech therapy, occupational therapy).

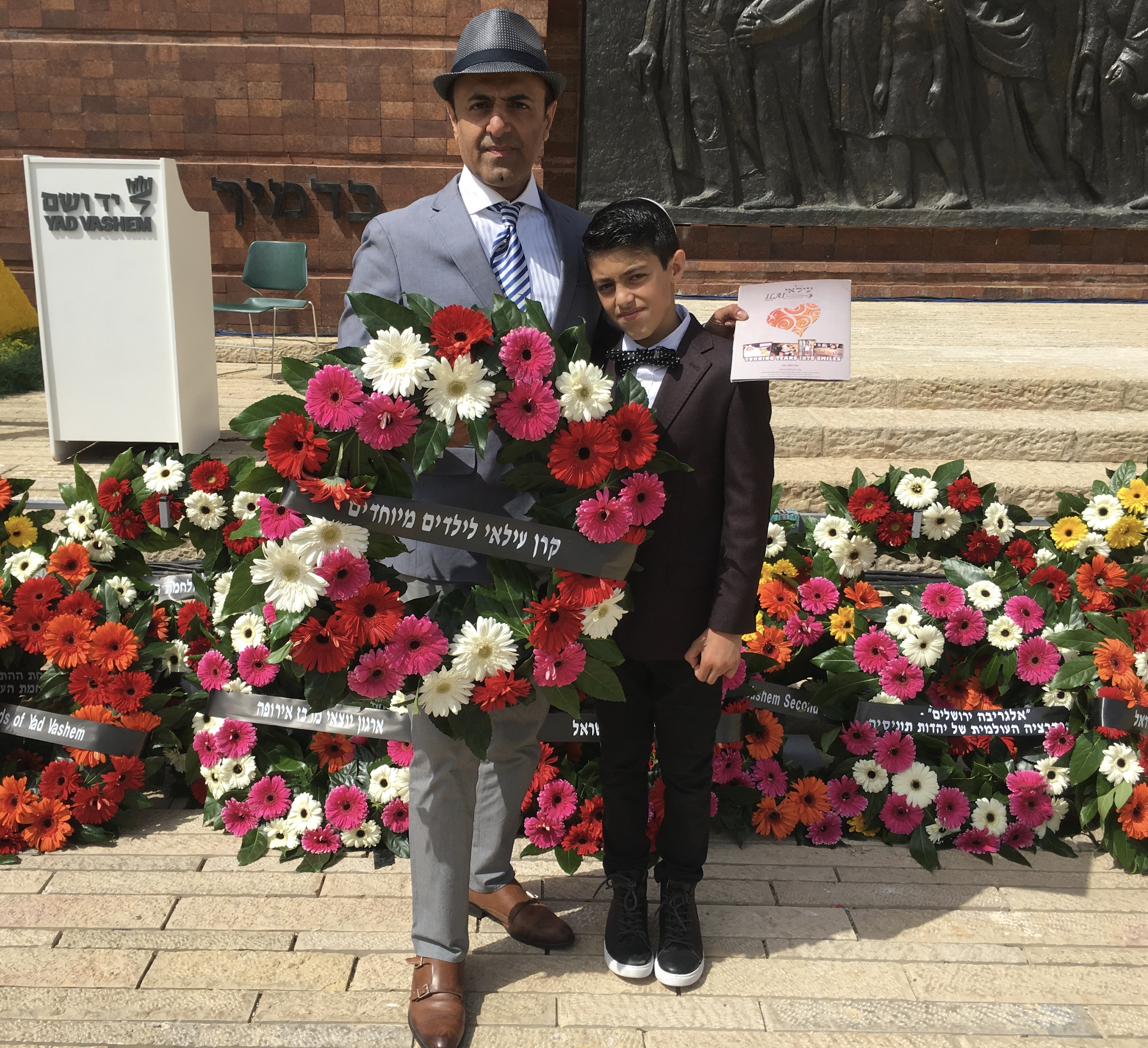
Albert Shaltiel and his son Ilai at the Wreath-Laying Ceremony at Yad Vashem during Yom HaShoa ceremony in April, 2018

== Holocaust remembrance ==
On top of its charitable activities the ILAI Fund is active in Holocaust remembrance. In 2018, the ILAI Fund took part in the Wreath-Laying Ceremony during Holocaust Remembrance Day at Yad Vashem in Jerusalem together with the Prime Minister of Israel and other notable public figures as well as many Holocaust survivors. ILAI Fund representatives laid down a wreath in the memory of around 300,000 often forgotten disabled and special needs victims of the Nazi regime that were persecuted and murdered as a part of a program the Nazis dubbed T-4.

In 2019, thanks largely due to efforts made by Albert Shatliel, Yad Vashem honored the 270,000 disabled victims of the Holocaust. At the ceremony, Shatliel related that his life experience in Iran prompted him to do everything in his power in order to commemorate the Holocaust: “When we say never again, we mean it. Yet another Holocaust could happen in a few years. When Iran says that they want to wipe us out, they also mean it. We have to take this message seriously. It’s not just a curse. It’s an ambition that they long for.”

== Aiding Children in Foster Homes ==
The fund also assists children in foster homes and provides them with clothing, books, gifts, bed sheets, towels, toys and more. Children up to the age of ten are sent to such facilities by court order in cases where municipalities and social services find it necessary to remove them from harmful surroundings. An abusive, violent or dysfunctional home environment may be placing the child at risk, as well as addicted or alcoholic parents.
