= Iranian Parliament religious minority reserved seats =

There are five reserved seats in the Iranian Parliament (Majlis) for the religious minorities. After the Persian Constitutional Revolution, the Constitution of 1906 provided for reserved parliamentary seats granted to the recognized religious minorities, a provision maintained after the 1979 Iranian Revolution. There are two seats for Armenians and one for each other minority: Assyrians, Jews and Zoroastrians. Given that the Bahá'í Faith is not recognized, they do not have seats in the parliament. Sunni Muslims have no specific reserved seats, but can take part in the ordinary election process at all constitutional levels. Sunni members of parliament are mostly from areas with strong Sunni ethnic minorities like Kurdistan and Baluchistan.

== List ==
List of minority MPs in recent Majlis:

Year	Armenians (North)	Armenians (South)	Assyrian	Jewish	Zoroastrian
1980	Hrair Khalatian	Hrach Khachatryan	Sargon Betoshana	Khosrow Naqi	Parviz Malekpur
1984	Vartan Vartanian	Artavaz Baghumian	Atour Khananichou	Manuchehr Kalimi-Nikruz	Parviz Malekpur
1988	Vartan Vartanian	Artavaz Baghumian	Atour Khananichou	Manuchehr Kalimi-Nikruz	Aflatun Ziyafat
1992	Vartan Vartanian	Artavaz Baghumian	Shamshoon Maqsudpour Sir	Kuros Keyvani	Parviz Ravani
1996	Vartan Vartanian	Artavaz Baghumian	Shamshoon Maqsudpour Sir	Manuchehr Eliasi	Parviz Ravani
2000	Levon Davidian	Georgik Abrahamian	Yonathan Betkolia	Maurice Motamed	Khosrow Dabestani
2004	Gevork Vartan	Robert Beglarian	Yonathan Betkolia	Maurice Motamed	Kourosh Niknam
2008	Gevork Vartan	Robert Beglarian	Yonathan Betkolia	Siyamak More Sedgh	Esfandiar Ekhtiyari
2012	Karen Khanlaryan	Robert Beglarian	Yonathan Betkolia	Siyamak More Sedgh	Esfandiar Ekhtiyari
2016	Karen Khanlaryan	Georgik Abrahamian	Yonathan Betkolia	Siyamak More Sedgh	Esfandiar Ekhtiyari
2020	Ara Shaverdian	Robert Beglarian	Sharli Anvieh (Charlie Anooyeh Tekyeh)	Homayoun Sameh	Esfandiar Ekhtiyari
2024	Ara Shaverdian	Gagard Mansourian	Sharli Anvieh (Charlie Anooyeh Tekyeh)	Homayoun Sameh	Behshid Barkhodar
