= Homayoun =

- Gender: Male

Origin
- Origin: Iran
- Region of origin: Iran, Afghanistan, Pakistan, Azerbaijan, Kurdistan, Turkmenistan, Uzbekistan, Tajikistan, India

Homayoun (Persian: همایون, romanized: Humāyūn), also romanized as Humayun, Homayoon or Homayun is a Persian male given name, it also appears as a surname.

== Given name ==
- Humayun (1508–1556), Mughal Emperor
- Homayoun Ardalan (1950–1992), Iranian Kurdish politician
- Homayoun Behzadi (1942–2016), Iranian footballer
- Homayoun Ershadi (1947–2025), Iranian actor
- Homayoun Katouzian (born 1942), Iranian academic
- Homayoun Khorram (1930–2013), musician, composer
- Homayoun Sameh Najafabadi, Iranian politician
- Homayoun Seraji (1947–2007), Iranian scientist
- Homayoun Shahrokhi (born 1946), Iranian football player, coach, and manager
- Homayoun Shajarian (born 1975), Iranian singer
- Homayoon Toufighi (born 1990), chess grandmaster
- Homayoon Kazerooni, a roboticist and Berkley professor of Mechanical Engineering

== Surname ==
- Dariush Homayoon (1928–2011), Iranian journalist, author, and politician
- Saba Homayoon (born 1977), a Canadian-Iranian actress.
- Shahram Homayoun, Iranian television channel owner
