= Ghulam Nabi Khan =

Afghan envoy to the Soviet Union

Sardār Ghulam Nabi Khan Charkhi

Afghan Envoy to the Soviet Union
- In office 1922–1923

Afghan Envoy to France
- In office 1926–1928

Afghan Envoy to Soviet Union
- In office 1928–1928

Personal details
- Born: 1890 Charkh, (Note: May also be known by the name, Ali Ghulam Nabi Charkhi due to the Afghan name) Emirate of Afghanistan
- Died: November 8, 1932 (aged 41–42) Kingdom of Afghanistan

Military service
- Allegiance: Kingdom of Afghanistan
- Rank: General
- Battles/wars: Afghan Civil War (1928–1929): Red Army intervention in Afghanistan (1929); Basmachi Movement X

Ghulam Nabi Khan (1890–1932) A Yusufzai pashtun from Charkh, was an Afghan military general and diplomat, the Envoy to France in 1926 and ambassador to Moscow in 1922 and 1928 He held the rank of Lewa Mishar (general) under Amir Habibullah Khan and then later under King Amanullah Khan. His father was the late Sepah Salar (commander-in-chief) Ghulam Haidar Khan under Amir Abdur Rahman Khan, and his brothers included Brigadier Ghulam Jilani Khan and Ghulam Siddiq.

He was invited to what he thought was a meeting with King Nadir Shah where he could persuade him to allow King Amanullah to return to Afghanistan. Instead, he was beaten to death without trial and his six-year-old son was jailed.

One of his household servants was Abdul Khaliq Hazara, who assassinated King Nadir Shah on 8 November 1933, on the day Ghulam Nabi Khan was executed exactly one year prior.

== Early military career ==
He became an orderly colonel in June 1904 and an orderly brigadier the following year. In June 1906 he was given command of the forces in Nangarhar. By November 1907 he was reported to have taken command of all troops in Kabul.

== Disgrace and rehabilitation ==
In 1909 he was commanding Afghan forces at Patan when they crossed into British territory near Kharlachi. The Kurram Militia pushed them back, and he fell out of favour with Amir Habibullah Khan. He held no military post until 1912, when he served in a junior role in a campaign against the Mangal tribe. This partly restored his standing, and in December 1912 he was moved to the command at Jabal Saraj. In 1913 he was dismissed from Amir Habibullah Khan's service after Brigadier Abdul Ahad Khan, head of the Malikyar family, was murdered in the Upper Logar Valley. In 1918 the Amir pardoned him, his brother Ghulam Jilani and several other relatives.

== Postwar commands ==
By June 1919 he was commanding at Jalalabad under King Amanullah Khan. In August 1919 he went with the Dakka Boundary Commission, and in September he toured Nangarhar to recover looted rifles. In August 1920 he left Jalalabad for Asmar to replace Brigadier Usman Khan. He was recalled soon after, and by September 1920 he was in Kabul preparing to take command of the corps at Mazar-i-Sharif.

== Diplomatic career ==
He left Mazar-i-Sharif in November 1921 and travelled through Bukhara to Moscow, where he was the Afghan ambassador from 1922 to 1923. He was recalled in spring 1924 and made Under-Secretary at the Foreign Office. During the Mangal Rebellion of 1924–25 he was sent to Logar to use his influence to help keep the peace. At the end of 1925 he became Governor of Samt-i-Janubi (Paktia). He held that post until August 1926, when he was named Afghan minister in Paris. He left Kabul for Paris by way of India on 16 October 1926. Habibullah Tarzi replaced him in November 1928, and he was then re-appointed ambassador to Moscow.

== 1929 campaign and execution ==
In 1929 he led a force into northern Afghanistan to support King Amanullah’s government. Its officers were Afghan cadets who had been training in Turkey. He took Mazar-i-Sharif but withdrew in favour of the forces of Habibullah Kalakani (Bacha-i-Saqao) when he learned that Amanullah had abdicated for good. He came back to Afghanistan with Shah Wali Khan in July 1932. On 8 November 1932 he was executed for subversive activities against King Nadir Shah, and his entire family was imprisoned at their family home.
