= Albert Elay Shaltiel =

Israeli philanthropist (born 1969)

- אלברט אלי שאלתיאל
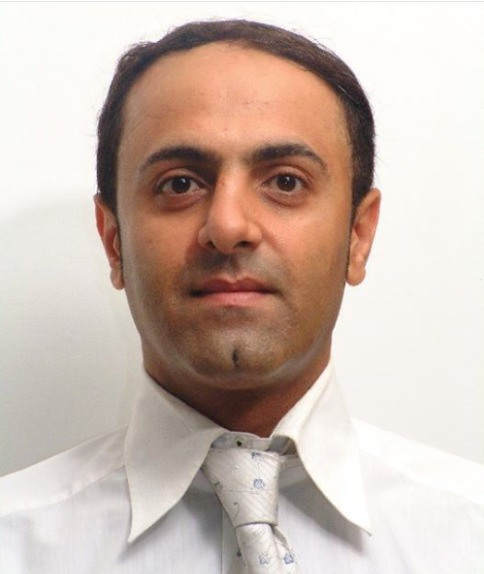
- Born: 4 March 1969 (age 57); Teheran, Iran
- Known for: Founder of ILAI Fund
- Spouse: Yael Shaltiel
- Children: four

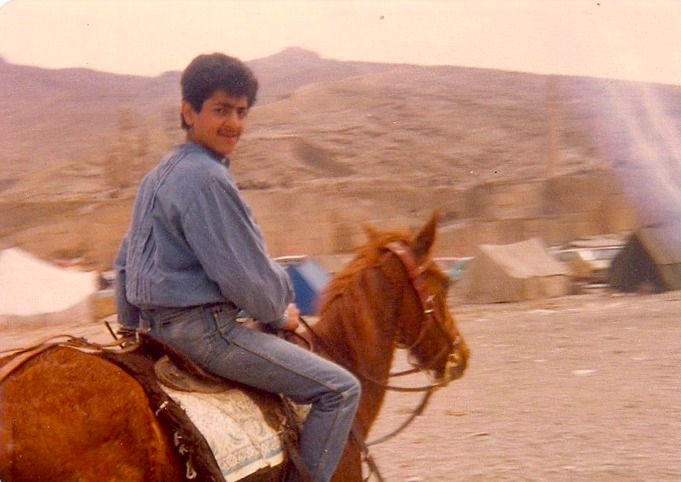
Albert Shaltiel during his escape from Iran

Albert Elay Shaltiel (Hebrew: אלברט אלי שאלתיאל, Persian: آلبرت الی شلتیل; born 4 March 1969) is the founder and director of the ILAI Fund which assists children with disabilities. He was born in Iran from which he fled and emigrated to the United States and later moved to Israel. Albert began his charity work officially in 2005, and today 2024 supported and helped over Four thousand special needs children with the charity he founded, the ILAI Fund - "a special fund to support children with special needs"

Shaltiel was born in Tehran and educated in Jewish schools until the Iranian Revolution in 1978. At 16, he was forced into paramilitary exercises, prompting his decision to flee Iran. After a harrowing escape through Afghanistan and Pakistan, during which he was imprisoned and tortured, Shaltiel eventually reached Vienna in 1988. He later moved to Los Angeles, where he became an entrepreneur and active in the Iranian-American Jewish community. In 2000, Shaltiel immigrated to Israel, where he married and started a family.

Shaltiel is also involved in Holocaust remembrance activities, participating in annual ceremonies at Yad Vashem and emphasizing the importance of preventing future genocides, particularly in light of his experiences in Iran.

== Early life ==
Albert was born, the fourth of five children, at the Dr. Sapir Hospital in Tehran. He studied in Ozar HaTorah, a traditional Jewish primary school. Albert's father, Abraham Shaltiel, earned his living in textiles and also invested in real estate. They were affluent and lived comfortably.

Following the Iranian Revolution in 1978 and the outbreak of the Iran-Iraq war in 1980, life in Iran changed. It became more difficult to be openly Jewish and Albert's high school, Alliance, lost its Jewish character. At the age of 16, Albert was forced to take part in paramilitary exercises in order to take part in the war.

== Escape from Iran ==
Following his forced conscription, Albert decided to flee. With the help of smugglers, he planned his escape route through Afghanistan and Pakistan, via Zahedan in southeastern Iran. During his escape he was arrested, brutally tortured and imprisoned.

Albert was restrained in a jail cell with 20 Baluchi tribesmen. Fortunately for him, while being transported back to Tehran, his van crashed and he was sent to a field hospital from where he would later on be rescued by Balochi tribesmen. He stayed with the Baloch for a month before moving to America.

After months of clandestine and arduous travel, Albert arrived in Vienna in 1988, where he awaited his visa for a year. In Vienna, he was helped by HIAS, an American non-profit organisation that provides humanitarian aid and assistance to refugees. Eventually, he joined his brother in Los Angeles, where he became an entrepreneur and an active member of the Iranian-American Jewish community.

He arrived in Israel in 2000. He met and married Yael, his wife, shortly afterward, and today they are parents to four children.

== Charity and philanthropy ==
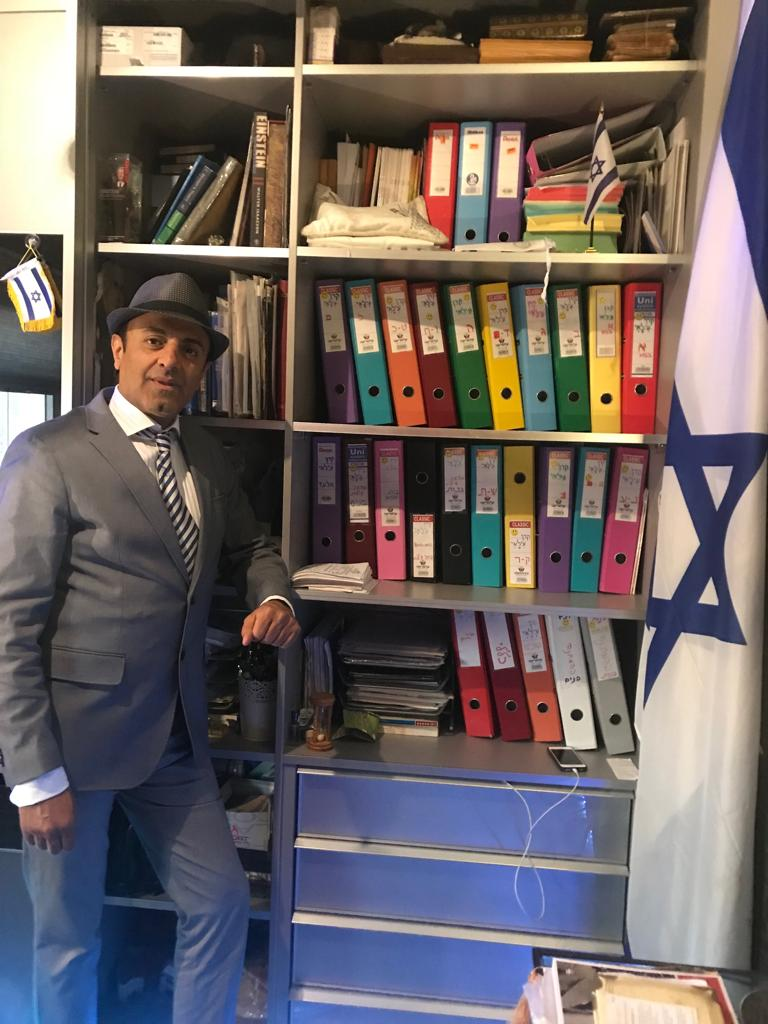
Albert Shaltiel in the office of ILAI Fund

After years of unsuccessful fertility treatments, the Shaltiel couple considered adoption. They visited a facility for disabled orphans in Haifa. Deciding that the “needs of the many” outweighed the needs of the few, Albert started raising and distributing money for medical equipment and therapy for sick children.

In 2005, the couple was blessed with a natural pregnancy and their healthy son, Ilai, was born.

That same year, Albert decided to establish the ILAI Fund in their firstborn's name, and continue their fundraising and charitable work officially. As of early 2022, the ILAI Fund has assisted and continues to assist close to 3000 children with special needs and their families from low-income backgrounds, with special focus on single mother households.

Albert decided to dedicate the work of the ILAI Fund to those who suffer from physical, emotional and mental disabilities. The ILAI Fund assists those whose financial situation prevents them from receiving the proper care to meet their children's needs.

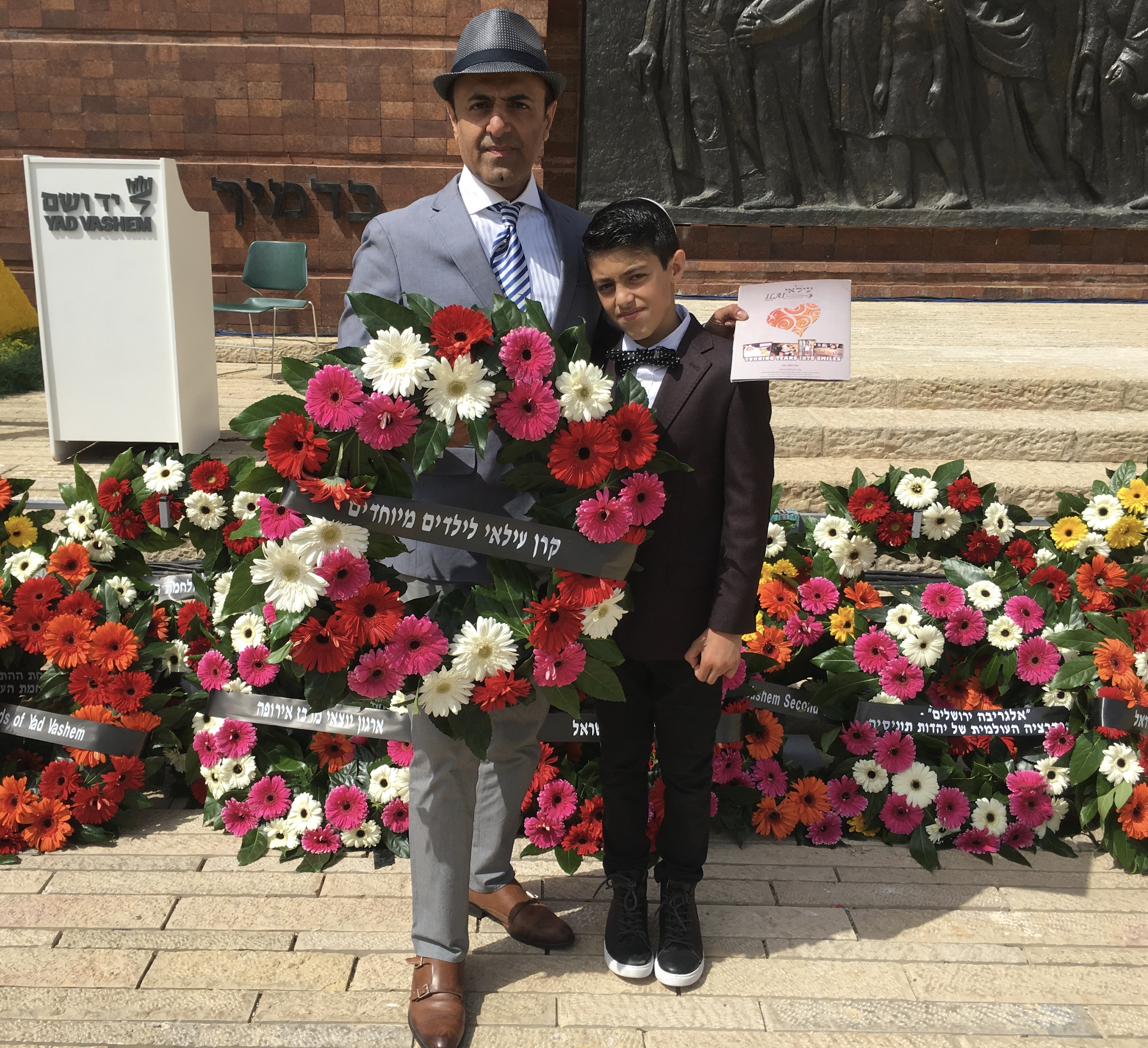
Albert and his son Ilai at the Wreath-Laying Ceremony at Yad Vashem.

== Holocaust remembrance ==
As a representative of the ILAI Fund, Albert attends the annual Wreath-Laying Ceremony on Holocaust Remembrance Day at the Yad Vashem Holocaust Museum in Jerusalem.

In 2018, Albert and his son, Ilai, 13, laid a wreath in memory of the approximately 300,000 disabled and special needs victims of the Nazi regime, persecuted and murdered as a part of a program the Nazis dubbed “T-4”.

Shatliel related that his life experience in Iran prompted him to do everything in his power in order to commemorate the Holocaust: “When we say never again, we mean it. Yet another Holocaust could happen in a few years. When Iran says that they want to wipe us out, they also mean it. We have to take this message seriously. It’s not just a curse. It’s an ambition that they long for.” Shatliel noted that Iran is fulling such ambitions via their proxies in Lebanon, Syria and Gaza: “Iran has tentacles everywhere.”

== See also ==
- Iranian Jews
- Iranian Jews in Israel
- ILAI Fund
