= Haroun Yashayaei =

Iranian Jewish activist

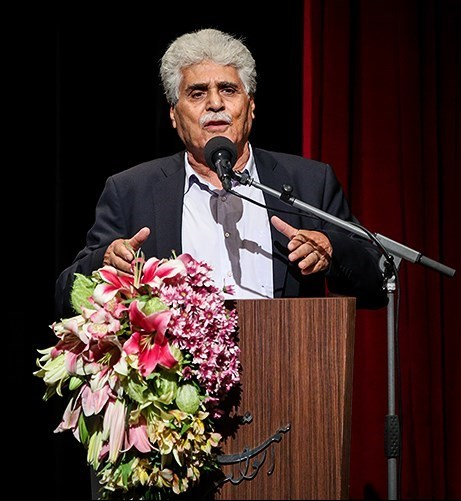

Haroun Yashayaei (born 23 September 1935) (Persian: هارون یشایایی) is former chairman of the board of the Tehran Jewish Committee and former leader of Iran's Jewish community. On January 26, 2006, Yashayaei's letter to the Iranian President Mahmoud Ahmadinejad, concerning his Holocaust denial comments, brought about worldwide media attention, including an interview with Der Spiegel.

== Early life ==
Yashayaei was born in a religious Jewish family in Oudlajan in south Tehran. His father Moshe Hayyim was a butcher in the local Jewish community. He studied in Alliance Israélite school in Tehran and entered the university of Tehran to study Philosophy. During this time, he joined the "Bani Adam" magazine which was run by Jewish branch of Tudeh Party. For his activities in the Tudeh (communist) party he was arrested and was sentenced to nine months in prison. After release Yashayaei became active in Anjoman-e-Kalimian which oversaw the Jewish community of Tehran.

== In Iranian Cinema ==
Yashayaei is a well known Iranian producer and among the pioneers in this field. He has produced numerous movies and was awarded as the best producer of the Islamic republic in the 28th Fajr Festival in 2008.

== Personal life ==
Yashayaei is married to a woman named Farida from the well known Pouratian family. He has a daughter, Marjan, who works with his father and a son, Arash (Kiarash), who manages the Pakhshiran company.
