= University of Kurdistan =

University of Kurdistan may refer to:

- University of Kurdistan (Iran), Sanandaj, Iranian Kurdistan Province
- Kurdistan University of Medical Sciences, Sanandaj, Iranian Kurdistan Province
- University of Kurdistan Hewler, Hawler (Erbil), Kurdistan Region, Iraq
