= Maurice Motamed =

Iranian Jewish politician (1945-)

Member of the Islamic Consultative Assembly for Jews
- In office 2000–2008
- Leader: Ali Khamenei
- Preceded by: Manuchehr Eliasi
- Succeeded by: Siyamak More Sedgh

Member of the Energy Committee
- In office 2000–2008

Deputy Chair of the Iran-Australia Parliamentary Friendship

Personal details
- Born: 1945 (age 80–81) Hamedan, Pahlavi Iran
- Spouse: Mitra Golian
- Education: Khajeh Nasir Toosi University of Technology

Maurice Motamed or Morris Motamed (Persian: موریس معتمد; born 1945) is an Iranian politician and expert who was elected in 2000 and again in 2004 as a Jewish member of the Iranian Parliament. He was preceded by Manuchehr Eliasi and succeeded by Siamak Moreh Sedgh, representing the Jewish community which has by Iran's constitution retained a reserved seat since the Persian Constitution of 1906.

== Early life and career ==
Motamed was born in 1945 to a religious Jewish family from Hamedan. He attended Ferdowsi Elementary and Takht-e Jamshid High Schools in Tehran. After completing his education in 1967 with an Associate Degree in Surveying and Cartography, he joined the National Cartographic Center, a subsidiary of the Planning and Budget Organization. He pursued further studies and in 1972, earned his Bachelor's degree from the School of Surveying, a division of Khajeh Nassir Toosi University. In 1973, he received an international scholarship from the G.S.I. organization in Japan, where he studied Geodesy and Seismic Forecasting. Four years later, he was awarded another scholarship, this time by I.T.C. at the University of Twente in the Netherlands, to study Aerial Photogrammetry and Surveying.

From 1967 until 1986, Motamed served in the government sector for two decades, holding various positions at both the Bachelor and Masters levels, eventually leading significant divisions. In the private sector, he transitioned to an engineering consulting firm, becoming its C.E.O. for 14 years.

== Member of Parliament ==
In 2000, Motamed became most prominent as he won the Jewish seat in the Sixth Islamic Parliament, where he served as a representative for the Jewish community. This required him to relinquish other professional roles.

In Parliament, he has been active in defending Jews, Christians and Zoroastrians against discrimination. He also played a prominent role in the efforts to alleviate the sentences against some members of the Jewish community for alleged spying or illegally trying to flee the country. He also served as a member of the Parliament's Energy Committee. In various media, Motamed has regularly expressed his support for the official positions of the Iranian government on international affairs, including support for Iran's nuclear program (he was a member of the Majlis energy commission).

With regard to Holocaust denial comments made by Iran's former president Mahmoud Ahmadinejad, Motamed has expressed significant concerns, noting that "Denial of such a great historical tragedy that is connected to the Jewish community can only be considered an insult to all the world's Jewish communities." He also criticised Iranian television for broadcasting antisemitic programmes. He also added that, "The Iranian Jews have been present in this country for a long time, for some 2,700 [years]. During these 2,700 years they have always been in full understanding with the society, they've lived in friendship and brotherhood, so therefore I don't think that bringing up such an issue could damage the Jewish community in Iran."

Motamed was re-elected to the Seventh Islamic Parliament in 2004, continuing his work while still holding his previous roles. He attended numerous international conferences on interfaith dialogue, furthering his involvement in religious tolerance and diplomacy. Among his legislative achievements, Motamed played a key role in ratifying the law of dieh, ensuring equal monetary retribution for bodily harm or death regardless of religious affiliation, which represented a significant advancement in the protection of religious minorities' rights in Iran. He also helped secure annual government budgets to support the cultural, social, and religious needs of religious minorities. Additionally, he fought against discrimination in government employment, particularly in education, and helped ease barriers faced by religious minorities.

== Energy Committee and Philanthropy ==
At the beginning of his parliamentary term in 2000, Motamed accompanied Speaker Mehdi Karoubi and later Iranian President Mohammad Khatami to the United Nations General Assembly in New York. He also joined Khatami at the 2000 World Leaders Summit.

During his tenure in the Sixth Parliament, Motamed was appointed to the Energy Committee and traveled to various global oil and gas industries, including in Russia, Malaysia, Singapore, Saudi Arabia, and the North Sea. He was also honored to represent Iran as Deputy Chair of the Iran-Australia Parliamentary Friendship, visiting Australia as part of the Iranian parliamentary delegation.

His philanthropic efforts began in 1982, notably when he contributed to the revision of the Tehran Jewish Association’s charter and aided in the creation of a kosher meat preparation facility. In 1986, he joined the Board of Directors of the Tehran Jewish Association, later chairing committees and ultimately serving as President for two terms.

== Personal life ==
In his personal life, Maurice Motamed married Mitra Golian in 1981. After his eight years of service in Parliament, he was elected to the Board of Directors of Dr. Rouhollah Sapir Hospital in 2007, where he was unanimously selected as Chair. Today, he continues to contribute to the Jewish community, serving as a high-ranking advisor to the Tehran Jewish Association, alongside his other ongoing commitments.

== See also ==
- Persian Jews
- Iranian Parliament religious minority reserved seats
- Iran–Israel relations
