= Zalmay =

Zalmay, Zalmai, Zalmeh, or Zalmie is a Pashtun male given name found amongst the Pashtuns of Pakistan and Afghanistan. Its meaning is loosely translated as "youth" or "young man". In Afghanistan, the name appears amongst non-Pashtuns as well.

- Zalmai Aziz (born 1940), former Afghan Ambassador to the Russian Federation
- Zalmay A. Gulzad, professor, author, lecturer and researcher into contemporary Afghan politics
- Zalmay Khalilzad (born 1951), counselor at the Center for Strategic and International Studies (CSIS) and president of Khalilzad Associates
