= Humayun Khan =

Humayun Khan may refer to:

== Khan as surname ==
- Ala ud-din Sikandar Shah (died 1394), born Hamayun Khan, Sultan of Delhi
- Humayun Khan (diplomat) (1932–2022), Pakistani diplomat
- Humayun Saifullah Khan (born 1943), Pakistani politician
- Humayun Akhtar Khan (born 1955), Pakistani politician
- Humayun Khan (soldier) (1976–2004), Pakistani-American US Army soldier killed in action
- Humayun Khan (politician), Pakistani politician
- Humayun Muhammad Khan, Pakistani politician
- Munawar Humayun Khan (born 1941), Pakistani chair of the Board of Directors of the Sarhad Rural Support Programme

== Khan as middle name ==
- Humayun Khan Bangash, Commander of the IV Corps of the Pakistan Army, 1993–1996
- Humayun Khan Mandokhel (born 1962), Pakistani senator
- Mir Humayun Khan Marri (fl. 1997–2011), Pakistani senator
- Humayun Khan Panni, Deputy Speaker of the Jatiyo Sangsad of Bangladesh, 1991–1996
