= Azizullah Karzai =

Afghan politician

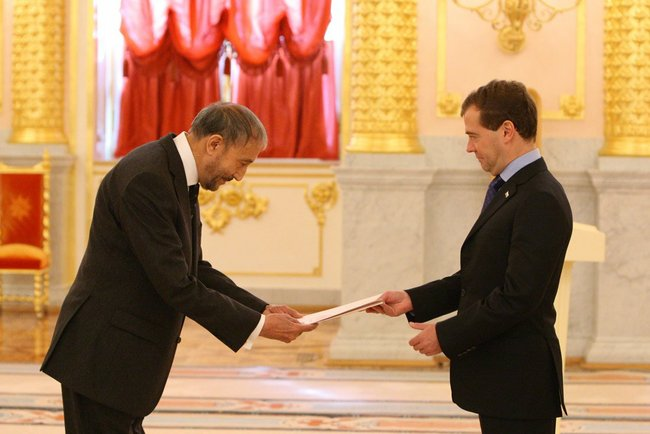
- Azizullah Karzai with Russian President Dmitry Medvedev in October 2010

Afghanistan Ambassador to Russia
- In office 2010–2013
- President: Hamid Karzai
- Preceded by: Zalmai Aziz

Personal details
- Born: Kandahar
- Profession: Diplomat

Azizulah Karzai is a politician in Afghanistan. He served as Ambassador to Russia, a position he held from 28 August 2010 until 2013.

== Early years ==
Azizullah is originally from southern Afghanistan. He belongs to the Karzai-clan of Pashtuns. He is an uncle of former Afghan President Hamid Karzai. Before the Taliban government he was Afghan Ambassador to Poland. He is considered the family's expert on tribal maneuvering. During the United States attack on Afghanistan in November 2001, he said: "Tribalism is more dangerous than the Islamic fundamentalism of the Taliban because it runs throughout Pashtun society."

== Ambassador ==
After the fall of the Taliban government Karzai was appointed Afghan Ambassador to the Czech Republic. He later became aid to the Afghan Foreign Minister and Ambassador to Saudi Arabia. From 2010 until 2013 he served as Afghanistan's Ambassador to Russia.
