= Nanguyalai Tarzi =

Afghan diplomat (born 1940)

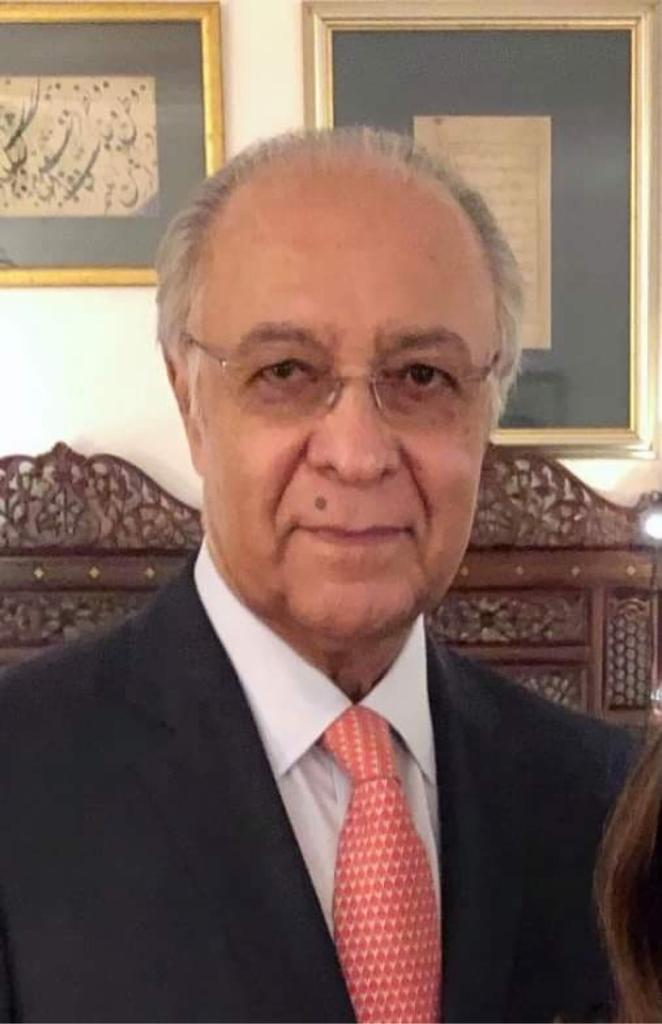
Nanguyalai Tarzi

Ambassador of Afghanistan to Switzerland and Permanent Representative to the United Nations office and other International Organisations in Geneva
- In office June 2013 – October 2015
- President: Hamid Karzai; Ashraf Ghani
- Preceded by: Zalmai Aziz
- Succeeded by: Suraya Dalil
- In office January 2007 – September 2010
- President: Hamid Karzai
- Preceded by: Assadullah Omar
- Succeeded by: Zalmai Aziz

Ambassador of Afghanistan to India
- In office January 2011 – May 2013
- President: Hamid Karzai
- Preceded by: Sayed Makhdoom Raheen
- Succeeded by: Shaida Mohammad Abdali

Personal details
- Born: 28 December 1940 (age 85) Kabul, Afghanistan
- Spouse: Hassina Tarzi
- Children: Farhad Tarzi; Mayena Tarzi Maiwand
- Education: Kabul University; Sorbonne University

Nanguyalai Tarzi (Pashto: ننگیالی طرزی; born 28 December 1940) – is a former senior Afghan diplomat who was the Afghan Ambassador to Switzerland and Permanent Representative to the United Nations office and other international organisations in Geneva. Tarzi has been the Ambassador of Afghanistan to India, and before that he was Permanent Representative to United Nations at Geneva and Afghan Ambassador to Switzerland, Ambassador of Afghanistan to Pakistan and Director of the United Nations Information Centres (UNIC) in Tehran, Iran. From 1980s to 1990s, Tarzi was Permanent Observer of Organisation of Islamic Cooperation (OIC) to the United Nations, Geneva, Switzerland and United Nations, Vienna, Austria and Senior Political Adviser and Deputy Permanent Observer of OIC to the United Nations, New York, United States of America. In the 1970s, Tarzi was the Afghan diplomat in Washington D.C., United States of America.

== 1960–70: Education and academic life ==
Tarzi was born in Kabul, Afghanistan, son of the late Mohammad Seddiq Tarzi. Tarzi is member of the prominent Afghan Tarzi family and is mentioned as notable member on the website of the Tarzi Family Historical Society.

Tarzi began his education at the Lycée Esteqlal school in Kabul. He graduated from Kabul University with distinction degree in Law and Diplomatic Relations in 1964. He completed a doctorate in Sorbonne University in International Public Law at the Faculté de Droit et sciences économiques in Paris, France in 1970. His doctorate thesis: “Les Relation Afghano-Russes”. Avec mention “Trés bien”, was a candidate for the Best Thesis of 1970. Tarzi began his career as an assistant professor at the Faculty of Law and Political Science in Kabul University from December 1964 to June 1970.

Tarzi is proficient in Dari (Persian), Pashto, French and English and has a basic knowledge of Arabic.

== 1970–2002: Diplomat and international organizations ==
Tarzi's diplomatic career began in June 1970 by working for the Department of Information in the Ministry of Foreign Affairs in Kabul. From December 1973 until November 1977, Tarzi was Second Secretary of the Afghan Embassy in Washington D.C. to the United States of America. Then from December 1977 to November 1978, Tarzi was Deputy of Department of International Financial & Economic Relations, Ministry of Foreign Affairs, Kabul, Afghanistan.

In 1980, after the Communists had seized power in Afghanistan, Tarzi began working as International Civil Servant Diplomat for Organisation of Islamic Cooperation (OIC). From November 1979 until September 1986, Tarzi was the Senior Political Adviser at the Office of the Permanent Observer Mission of OIC to the United Nations, New York, United States of America. From November 1986 to November 1992, Tarzi was Ambassador, Deputy Permanent Observer of OIC to the United Nations, New York, United States of America.

In 1992, Tarzi established the first office of OIC in Geneva. From November 1992 to January 2000, Tarzi was Ambassador, Permanent Observer of OIC to the United Nations Office and other International Organisations in Geneva. Simultaneously, from August 1997 to January 2000, Tarzi was Ambassador, Permanent Observer of OIC to United Nations Industrial Development Organization (UNIDO), United Nations Office on Drugs and Crime (UNODC) and United Nations in Vienna, Austria.

In January 2001 to November 2002, Tarzi became Director of the United Nations Information Centres (UNIC) in Tehran, Iran.

== 2002–2015: Afghan Ambassador ==
In 2002, after the fall of the Taliban Regime in Afghanistan, Tarzi was appointed as Afghan Ambassador Extraordinary and Plenipotentiary to Pakistan, from February 2003 to December 2006. As Ambassador to Pakistan, Tarzi was member of a Tripartite Commission, composed of senior military and diplomatic representatives from Afghanistan, Pakistan and the United States of America.

From January 2007 to September 2010, Tarzi became Ambassador and Permanent Representative of the Islamic Republic of Afghanistan to the United Nations office and other International Organisations based in Geneva. Simultaneously, from June 2007 till September 2010, Tarzi was Ambassador of the Islamic Republic of Afghanistan to Switzerland.

From January 2011 to May 2013, Tarzi served as Ambassador Extraordinary and Plenipotentiary to India and Non-Resident Ambassador to Bhutan, Maldives, Nepal and Sri Lanka.

In June 2013 to October 2015, Tarzi became Ambassador and Permanent Representative of the Islamic Republic of Afghanistan to the United Nations office and other International Organisations and Ambassador of the Islamic Republic of Afghanistan to Switzerland in Geneva.

== Diplomatic record ==
Date	Representing	Position	Mission
2013–2015	Afghanistan	Ambassador	Geneva, Switzerland
2013–2015	Afghanistan	Permanent Representative	United Nations at Geneva
2011–2013	Afghanistan	Ambassador and Non-Resident Ambassador	New Delhi, India and Bhutan, Maldives, Nepal and Sri Lanka
2007–2010	Afghanistan	Ambassador	Geneva, Switzerland
2007–2010	Afghanistan	Permanent Representative	United Nations at Geneva
2003–2006	Afghanistan	Ambassador	Islamabad, Pakistan
2000–2003	United Nations Information Centres (UNIC)	Director	Tehran, Iran
1992–2000	Organisation of Islamic Cooperation (OIC)	Ambassador and Permanent Observer	United Nations at Geneva and United Nations at Vienna
1986–1992	Organisation of Islamic Cooperation (OIC)	Ambassador and Deputy Permanent Observer	New York, United Nations
1980–1986	Organisation of Islamic Cooperation (OIC)	Senior Political Adviser	New York, United Nations
1977–1978	Afghanistan	Deputy Head of International Financial and Economic Relations Department, Ministry of Foreign Affairs	Kabul, Afghanistan
1973–1977	Afghanistan	Second Secretary	Washington D.C., United States of America
1970-1973	Afghanistan	Desk Officer, Department of Information, Ministry of Foreign Affairs	Kabul, Afghanistan
