= Tehran Jewish Committee =

Umbrella group of Jewish organizations

The Tehran Jewish Committee, formally registered in 1934, is an umbrella group of Jewish organizations that work on behalf of the Iranian Jews in Iran.

== History ==
The Tehran Jewish Committee was started in 1270 A.H. by a group of Jewish leaders in Tehran under the name "Hebra" (Hebrew for committee), then changed to "Committee of Jewish school" (Bet Sefer).In 1317 A.H., it changed its name to "Tehran Jewish Committee". One year later, it officially registered. The first board included : Loghman Neoharai, Enayatollah Montakhab, Abdullah Golshan, Morteza Moallem, Zia Nehourai, Aziz Elghanian, Yehouda Harounian, Eshagh Barukhim, Rohallah Ben Rouhi, Lalezar Safani, Effeni Famili.

== Activities ==
Taking care of synagogues in Tehran, maintaining the Kheirkhah hospital in Oudlajan (historic Jewish neighborhood), Jewish elderly care, Jewish cemetery in Khorasan Road, Kosher slaughterhouse, Bakery for Pesach holiday in Tehran no road and many schools and sports centers are among the activities of the Tehran Jewish Committee. In addition, Tehran Jewish Committee has created a Jewish legal authority which rules on Jewish matters.

== Current status ==
Rahmatollah Raffi is the present chairman of the board of the Tehran Jewish Committee preceded by Siamak Moreh Sedgh who is currently the Jewish Representative to the Iranian Senate. Dr. Moresadegh was preceded by Haroun Yashayaei. On January 26, 2007, Yashayaei's letter to President Mahmoud Ahmadinejad concerning his Holocaust denial comments brought about worldwide media attention. The Dr. Sapir Hospital and Charity Center is funded through the Tehran Jewish Committee. It is a charity hospital catering to hundreds of patients in need regardless of their faith or religious affiliation.

== See also ==
- History of the Jews in Iran
- List of synagogues in Iran
