= Roya (given name) =

- Gender: Female

Origin
- Origin: Persian
- Meaning: dream
- Region of origin: Iran (Persia)

Roya Persian: رویا), "dream", is a female name of Persian origin. It is common in Iran, Afghanistan, and Azerbaijan. Notable persons named Roya include:

- Röya (singer), Azerbaijani singer
- Roya Arab, Iranian musician and archaeologist
- Roya Farassat (born 1964) Iranian-born American painter, and sculptor
- Roya Hakakian, Iranian American Jewish poet, journalist, and writer
- Roya Heshmati, Kurdish-Iranian activist
- Roya Maboudian, American academic and researcher in the field of chemical engineering
- Roya Megnot, American actress
- Roya Mirelmi, Iranian theater, cinema and television actress
- Roya Nonahali, Iranian actress and director
- Roya Rahmani, Afghan diplomat
- Roya Ramezani, Iranian designer and women's rights campaigner
- Roya Rozati, India-based gynecologist and infertility specialist
- Roya Saberi Negad Nobakht, Iranian-British housewife who was imprisoned after she returned to Iran
- Roya Sadat, Afghan film producer and director
- Roya Teymourian, Iranian actress
- Roya Toloui, Kurdish-Iranian journalist, human rights activist and feminist
