= Esfandiar Ekhtiyari =

Iranian politician

Professor Esfandiar Ekhtiyari
- اسفندیار اختیاری
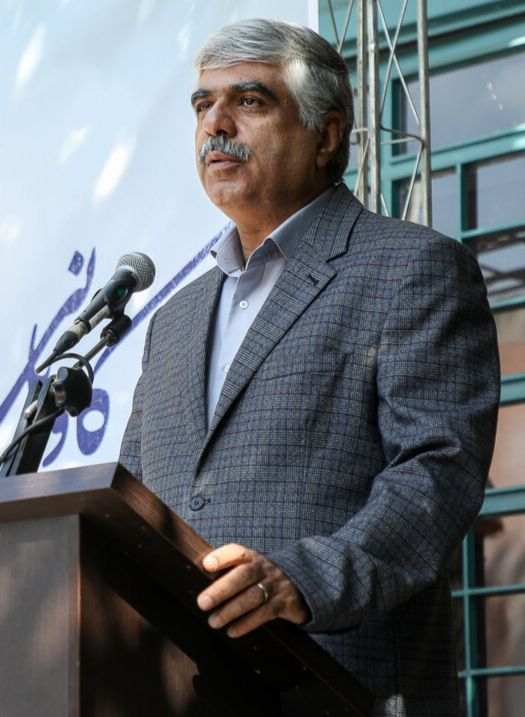

Member of the Islamic Consultative Assembly for Zoroastrians
- In office 27 May 2008 – 26 May 2024
- Preceded by: Kourosh Niknam
- Succeeded by: Behshid Barkhodar

Esfandiar Ekhtiyari, (Note: Given name also transliterated as Isfandiar, surname also transliterated as Ekhtiari) (Persian: اسفندیار اختیاری, born 1966), full name Esfandiar Ekhtiyari Kasnavieh Yazd (Persian: اسفندیار اختیاری کسنویه یزد), is a Zoroastrian Iranian scientist and politician. He is both a professor in Textile Engineering at Yazd University, and was the holder of the Iranian Parliament's reserved seat for the Zoroastrian minority from 2008 to 2024. As a former Member of Parliament, he used to speak on behalf of the Zoroastrian community of Iran. He has rebuked, and worked to prevent or end, laws and practices discriminatory towards his coreligionists. He was a member of the Education and Research Committee of the Iranian Parliament.

== Personal life and academic career ==
Ekhtiyari was born in Yazd in 1966. He received his bachelor's degree, master's degree, and PhD degrees at the Amirkabir University of Technology in Tehran from 1985 to 2001. His PhD degrees are in Textile Technology and in Management. Now an assistant professor in the Textile Engineering Department of Yazd University, he teaches not only textile-related courses but also management and thesis-writing. He has published papers on textile technology in English-language academic journals.

A current member of the Iranian Inventors' Association and Iranian Nanotechnology Association, Ekhtiyari has eight patents. He possesses a commercial pilot licence and an ultralight permit from the Iran Civil Aviation Organization as well. Ekhtiyari is licensed to practice as a basketball coach and referee by the Islamic Republic of Iran Basketball Federation. He also heads the Yadegar e Bastan Research Center, an institution supported by the Iranian Ministry of Science, Research and Technology, and is the chairman of Pars Nameh—the semi-official monthly newsletter of Iranian Zoroastrians.

Ekhtiyari is married and had one child as of 2009.

== Political career ==
Ekhtiyari won the reserved seat for the Zoroastrian minority in the 2008 Iranian legislative election and remained the incumbent Zoroastrian Member of Parliament until year of 2024. In the 2020 legislative election, he was the only religious minority to be re-elected.

Electoral history of Esfandiar Ekhtiyari
Election	Votes cast	Votes for Ekhtiyari	Percentage
2008	7,036	3,607	51.26%
2012	6,604	4,940	74.80%
2016	6,672	3,966	59.44%

In Iran's parliamentary committee system, Ekhtiyari was a member of the Education and Research Committee. He was also a member of the diplomatic Friendship Groups for the South American nations of Chile, Colombia, Ecuador, Guyana, and Venezuela.

Ekhtiyari describes his primary political role as that of a "community advocate" whose purpose is "to speak on behalf of any Zoroastrian in Iran, regardless of what his or her situation is." He maintains office hours for meeting fellow Zoroastrians who seek his assistance, usually over religious discrimination at school or at work and over property disputes, and spends much of his time writing letters and appealing to relevant authorities to safeguard his coreligionists' rights. For example, when a Zoroastrian student who had performed the best on a university entrance exam had his rank lowered due to "additional factors," Ekhtiyari appealed the student's case to the university administration and the Ministry of Education. In 2009, he rebuked the Ministry of Culture and Islamic Guidance for not censuring a film in which a criminal character had the sacred faravahar on his clothes. In 2017, Ekhtiyari protested attacks on the Zoroastrian Sadeh festival by Muslim individuals, and criticized a court decision that removed a Zoroastrian from the Yazd city council on grounds that a non-Muslim should not govern a majority-Muslim city. The decision was ultimately overturned by the Expediency Council. In 2019, Ekhtiyari wrote a public letter demanding that the government annul a new decree prohibiting non-Muslims from working at kindergartens with Muslim children, calling it an "inhumane and unethical decision". A "corrected" version of the directive was eventually published. Ekhtiyari has urged Zoroastrians living outside Iran to "return to [their] motherland," saying that the Iranian Zoroastrian community would welcome them "with open arms."

In 2015, Ekhtiyari strongly opposed a proposal to allow advertisements on the walls of schools, stating that "when students watch advertisements they will find no food for thought culture-wise and education-wise," and that schools should instead focus on creating a "happy environment" for students that will "enhance the character of the school children."

Ekhtiyari has criticized the Trump administration's 2018 unilateral withdrawal from the Iran nuclear deal.
