= Looking Beyond LA =

Special needs awareness organization

Looking Beyond is a US non-profit organization for children and young adults with special needs. Looking Beyond supports various organizations, programs and services with money collected through events and fundraising opportunities. It was established in 1999 by twelve women from Los Angeles. Since then, they organize yearly Gala dinners, and distribute the funds among tens of organizations, programs and hospitals.

== Beneficiaries ==
In 2018, Looking Beyond has disbursed more than $300,000 to 30 organizations, including United Cerebral Palsy LA, No Limit Theater Group for Deaf Children, Children's Hospital Orthopedic Department, ILAI Fund.

== Soaring Spirit Award ==
Every year during its yearly charity gala, Looking Beyond presents The Soaring Spirit Award to individuals who have broken through personal barriers, and serving as inspiration to others. In 2018, the Soaring Spirit Award was awarded to USC junior long snapper Jake Olson, who, despite eye cancer that cost him an eye at the age of 12, has accomplished his dream of playing football for his college. He has also written two books, and established his own foundation.

== Scholarship ==
In 2014, Looking Beyond established a special scholarship fund to provide tuition assistance to undergraduate USC Price School of Public Policy students with learning disabilities, such as attention deficit hyperactivity disorder, dyslexia, or auditory or visual processing problems. The program is called USC LB Scholarship.

== Awards ==
In 2018, the ILAI Fund, one of its repeat beneficiaries, awarded Looking Beyond LA with the Annual Best Donating Angel Award.
