= Abdul Khaliq Hazara (assassin) =

Assassin of Afghan king Nadir Shah

Shaheed Abdul Khaliq Hazara
- عبدالخالق هزاره
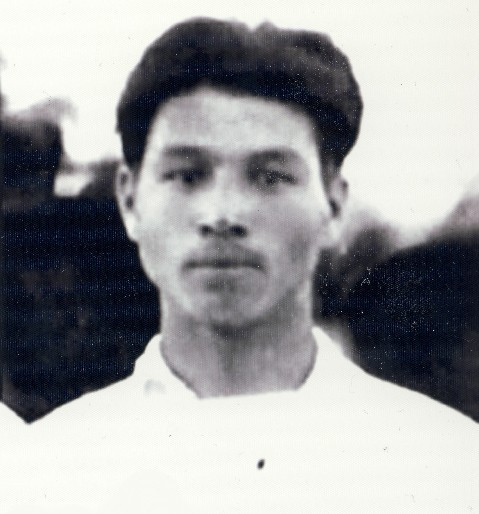
- Abdul Khaliq c. 1932
- Born: 1916; Chindawol, Emirate of Afghanistan
- Died: 18 December 1933 (aged 16–17); Kabul, Kingdom of Afghanistan
- Cause of death: Tortured and dismembered by the Royal Afghan Army
- Other names: Khaliqo خالقو
- Occupation: Student
- Known for: Assassination of King Mohammad Nadir Shah
- Movement: Amanullah loyalism

Abdul Khaliq Hazara (Dari/Hazaragi: عبدالخالق هزاره; 1916 – December 18, 1933) was an Afghan Hazara high school student who assassinated the King of Afghanistan, Mohammad Nadir Shah, on 8 November 1933, during an award distribution ceremony. He was quickly arrested, and tortured to death.

The motive for the assassination was reportedly in revenge for Nadir Shah's unjust taxes and extrajudicial killings of Hazaras, and for the killing of Ghulam Nabi Charkhi, a former Afghanistan ambassador to Moscow who took part in the Afghan civil war of 1928–29 as a supporter of the previous ruler, the reform-minded Amanullah Khan.

== Life ==
Khaliq was a household servant of Ghulam Nabi Khan and was devastated at his assassination.

== Assassination of the King ==
On 8 November 1933, Nadir Shah invited athletes of his high school to the palace to distribute medals for their achievements. Abdul Khaliq was one of the attendees and saw no security units at the gates. Abdul Khaliq rode his bike and was armed.

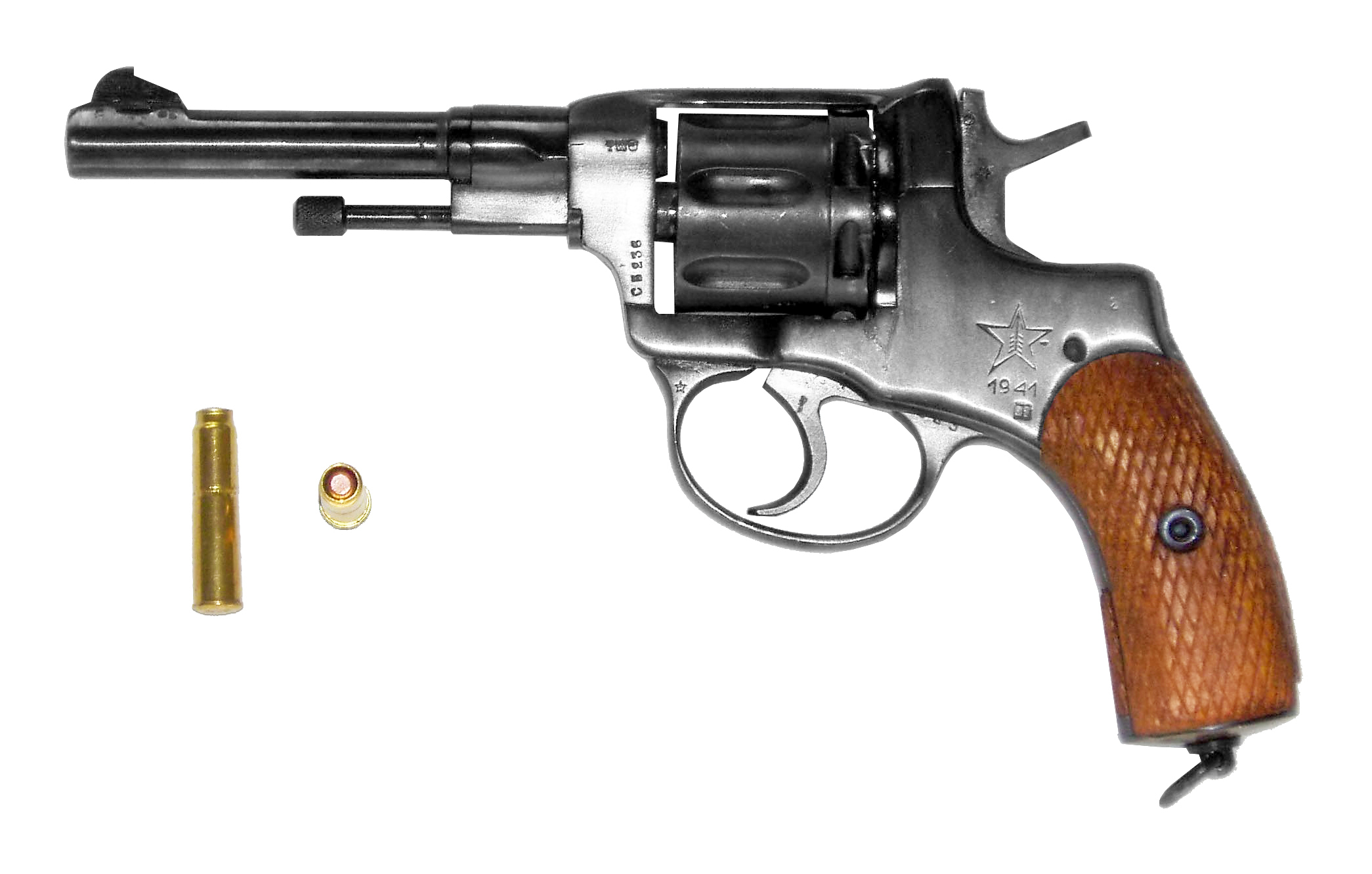
M1895, the type of revolver which Khaliq used to assassinate the King

Abdul Khaliq returned with a Nagant M1895 loaded with six rounds of 7.62×38mmR wrapped in a handkerchief hidden in his pocket. He stood behind Ishaq Sherdel and Mahmood. The national flag was lowered and Nadir Shah entered the rose garden. He examined the medals table and walked over towards the students. Abdul Khaliq reached into his pocket and pulled out the gun, aimed at Nadir Shah and pulled the trigger. The first bullet hit Nadir in his mouth, the second shot pierced Nadir's heart, and the third shot cut through one of Nadir's lungs. The guards rushed towards Abdul Khaliq and a fourth bullet hit a guard. Abdul Khaliq then threw the gun as the guards chased him.

== Execution ==
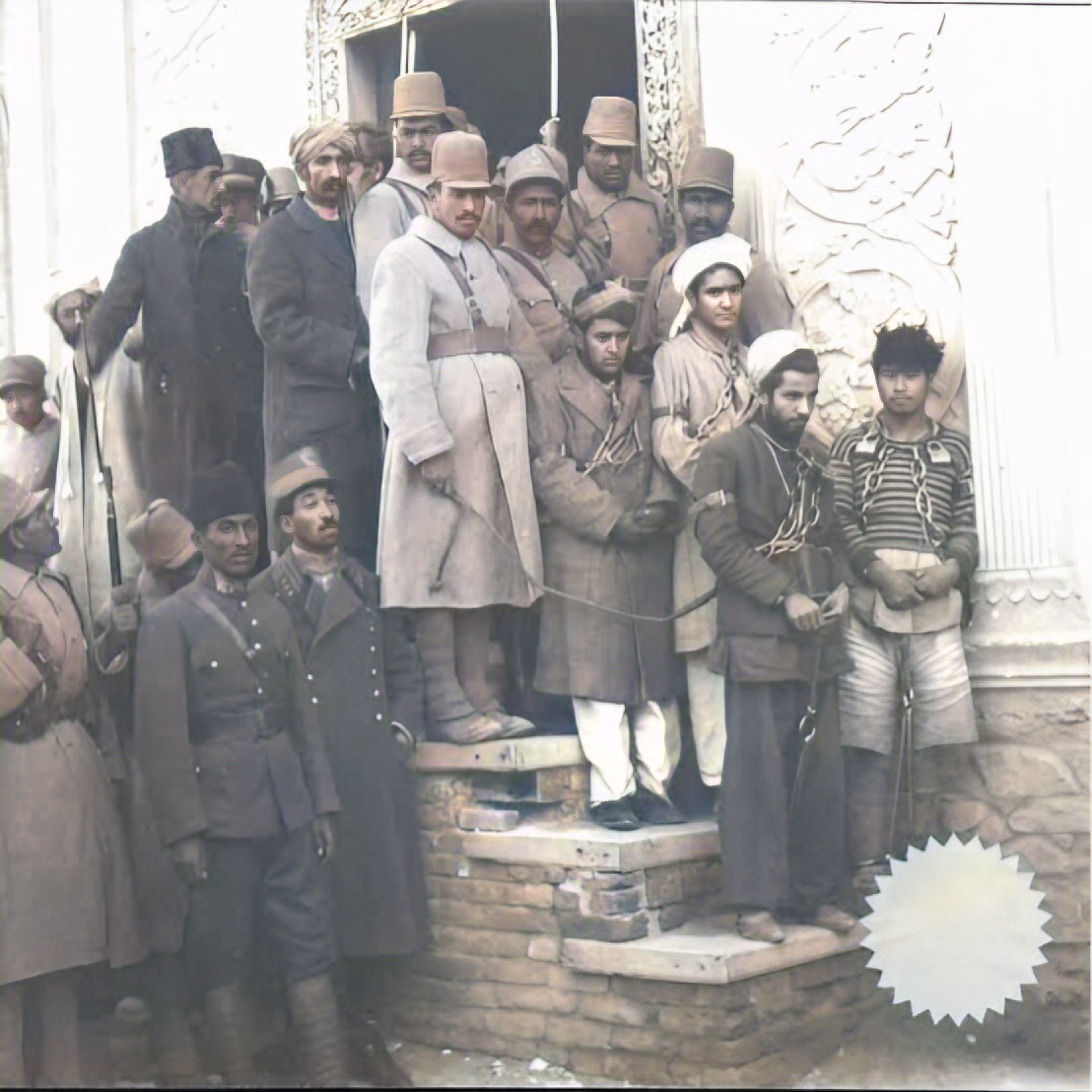
Abdul Khaliq Hazara with family taken as prisoners

Sixteen nooses were prepared at the execution site. Abdul Khaliq was brought over and was asked with which one of his fingers he squeezed the trigger. He lifted his index finger, and immediately that finger was cut off. He was then questioned which eye he used to aim, upon which they immediately gouged out that eye with a dagger. The authorities eventually tortured Abdul Khaliq Hazara to death instead of hanging him. Security officers reportedly tortured him by cutting out his tongue and gouging his eyes and soldiers killed him with bayonets while his family and friends were forced to watch.

== Legacy ==
Abdul Khaliq Hazara is considered to be a martyr by Hazaras and the Solidarity Party of Afghanistan.

== See also ==
- Hazara Genocide
- Assassination
- List of Hazara people
