= Hamayun, Afghanistan =

Hamayun همایون Khamayun, Homayun
- Location in Afghanistan
- Coordinates: 35°05′35″N 69°33′11″E
- Country: Afghanistan
- Province: Kapisa
- District: Mahmud Raqi
- Time zone: UTC+4:30

Hamāyūn (Homāyūn, Khamayun, همایون,) is a village in Kapisa Province of Afghanistan. Hamayun lies on the eastern slope of Mt. Nēshar.
