= Manuchehr Eliasi =

Iranian Jewish politician

Member of Parliament and Jewish Representative
- Leader: Ayatollah Khomeini; Ali Khamenei

Secretary of Health Commission

Personal details
- Born: 1946 (age 79–80) Sanandaj, Kurdistan province, Pahlavi Iran
- Spouse: Floura Tavakoli
- Children: 3

Manuchehr Eliasi or Manouchehr Eliasi (Persian: منوچهر الیاسی) is a former member of the Iranian Parliament who was succeeded by Maurice Motamed in 2000. He was born in the city of Sanandaj in 1946, and during his student days, he campaigned against the Shah's regime and was arrested for some time due to spreading leaflets. After the revolution, as one of the founders of the society of intellectuals of Kalimi, he continues his political and social activities within the society of Kalimi.

== Early life ==
Dr. Manouchehr Eliassi was born in 1942, to a religious Jewish family from Sanandaj in the western part of Iran. His birth coincided with the peak of World War II and during the exile of Reza Shah. His grandfather Agha Rahim Ashouri was a noted philanthropist and leader of the Sanandaj Jewish Association.

Dr. Eliassi attended Ettehad (Alliance) Elementary and Junior High Schools before moving on to Shahpour High School. In 1959, he passed the national university entrance exam, the Concours, with distinction, earning a spot at Tehran University's School of Medicine. After completing his medical degree in 1966, he served as a physician in the Health Corps during his mandatory military service. He later specialized in Gastroenterology at Shahid Beheshti University, completing his studies in 1973.

== Social causes ==
Dr. Eliassi became active in social causes starting in 1959, joining the Sazeman-e Danesh-jouyan (Iranian Jewish Academic Students Organization). His activism continued throughout his academic career, and he became involved with the Second Jebhe-ye Melli (National Front), participating in student movements during the 1960s and early 1970s. The Iranian Revolution of 1979 brought dramatic changes, prompting Dr. Eliassi and other Jewish leaders to form the Jame’e-ye Roshanfekran-e Yahoud (Jewish Intellectual Society) to continue their community work under new circumstances.

In 1983, following elections for the Tehran Jewish Association, Dr. Eliassi was appointed as its chairman, a role that placed him at the forefront during a challenging period of revolution and war. He also became a member of the board of directors at Dr. Rouhollah Sapir Hospital in 1980, contributing significantly for the next two decades.

== Political career ==
In 1996, Dr. Eliassi was elected as the representative of the Iranian Jewish community to the Fifth Islamic Parliament. As a parliamentarian, he focused on health issues, contributing to the Health Commission and serving as its Secretary. His work included attending international health summits, like the 1998 World Health Organization conference in Switzerland, and advocating for the rights of religious minorities, including proposing a bill regarding dieh (monetary retribution) for minority groups. His tenure also saw him play a key role in securing the release of 13 Jews arrested on espionage charges in Shiraz, demonstrating his dedication to his community.

== Personal life ==
Dr. Eliassi married Floura Tavakoli in 1973, and together they have three children: a son and two daughters. Now retired after more than 40 years in medicine, Dr. Eliassi continues to practice gastroenterology at Dr. Sapir Hospital in Tehran.

== See also ==
- Persian Jews
- Reserved Majlis seats
