= Humayun (name) =

Humayun, Homayoon, Humayoun, Homayun, Homayoon or Homayoun (Persian: همایون, romanized: Humāyūn) is a masculine given name and a surname of Persian origin. Notable people with the name are as follows:

== Given name ==
- Humayun (1508–1556), second emperor of the Mughal Empire
- Homayun (actor) (1937–2025), Iranian actor
- Humayun Shah (died 1461), sultan of the Bahmani Sultanate
- Humayun Ahmed (1948–2012), Bangladeshi writer, director and novelist
- Humayoun Ashraf (born 1986), Pakistani actor
- Humayun Azad (1947–2004), Bangladeshi author and poet
- Homayoun Ershadi (1947–2025), Iranian actor
- Humayun Faridi (1952–2012), Bangladeshi actor and drama organizer
- Humayun Kabir (disambiguation) several individuals
- Humayun Akhtar Khan (born 1955), Pakistani politician and businessman
- Humayun Khan (soldier) (1976–2004) Pakistani-American United States Army officer
- Mir Humayun Khan Marri (died 2024), Pakistani politician
- Homayoon Kazerooni, Iranian-born American roboticist
- Humayun Saeed (born 1971), Pakistani actor and producer
- Homayoun Sameh, Iranian politician
- Homayoun Shajarian (born 1975), Iranian singer
- Homayoun Shahrokhi (born 1946), Iranian football coach and former player
- Homayoon Toufighi (born 1990), Iranian chess grandmaster

== Surname ==
- Asaf Humayun (born 1952), Pakistani admiral
- Daryoush Homayoun (1928–2011), Iranian journalist
- Farhad Humayun (1978–2021), Pakistani musical artist
- Nuhash Humayun (born 1992), Bangladeshi film director and screenwriter
- Saba Homayoon (born 1977), Iranian-Canadian actress
- Shahram Homayoun, Iranian political dissident
