= Roya Rozati =

Indian infertility specialist

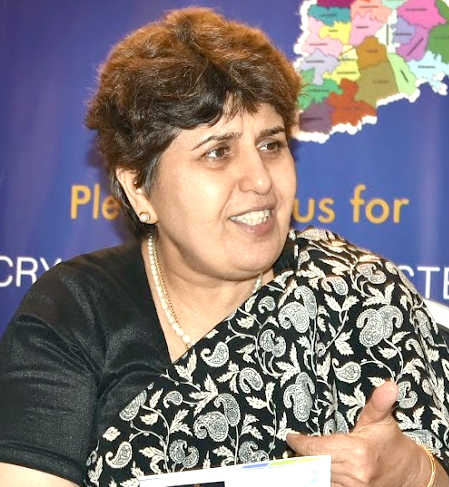
- Rozati addressing the meeting as the State Secretary of Indian Fertility Society Telangana Chapter
- Born: Hyderabad, India
- Education: Gulbarga University; All India Institute of Medical Sciences New Delhi; Fellow of the Royal College of Obstetricians and Gynaecologists London
- Known for: Infertility Treatment, IVF, Gynaecology
- Medical career
- Profession: Gynecologist, infertility specialist
- Institutions: Indian Medical Association; Indian Council of Obstetricians and Gynaecologists
- Sub-specialties: Infertility treatment, obstetrics, gynecology
- Research: Infertility
- Website: www.drroyarozati.com

Roya Rozati is an India-based gynecologist and infertility specialist. She is also the Professor and Head of the Department of Obstetrics and Gynaecology at the Shadan Institute of Medical Sciences and formerly served as the Professor and Head of the Department of Obstetrics and Gynaecology at Owaisi Hospital & Research Centre of the Deccan College of Medical Sciences. In addition, Rozati is also the founder of the Maternal Health & Research Trust, a specialized research and infertility treatment center in Hyderabad focusing on infertility issues. She is currently the National Advisor to Indian Fertility Society from Telangana State and A.R.T. Chief Specialist at MHRT Hospital and Research Center.

Her main areas of research are in Endometriosis, Obstetrics, stem cell biology and polyendocrine metabolic ovarian syndrome (PMOS) in India.

== Early life and career ==
Rozati was born and raised in Hyderabad, India. She attended the Gulbarga University in 1985, where she studied medicine (MBBS). After completing medicine degree, she completed postdoctoral studies from All India Institute Of Medical Sciences, New Delhi in 1990. After completing the education, Rozati joined Mahaveer Hospitals in 1995 as senior consultant.

In 1995, she joined the Deccan College Of Medical Sciences, resigned in the year 2020 and joined Shadan Institute of Medical Sciences where she currently serves as the Head of department, Gynecology. She has served on numerous conference program committees related to gynecology, edited journals, published articles, and is a Fellow of the Indian Council of Obstetricians and Gynaecologist (FICOG) and Member of the Indian Medical Association.

In 2000, she founded Medical Health & Research Trust, a multi-speciality fertility hospital in Hyderabad. Rozati serves as the ART Chief Specialist, Medical and Research Director of the hospital. She has previously chaired several conference program committees including, RCOG World Congress 2014 and was named as the “F.R.C.O.G. Fellow of the Royal College of Obstetrics and Gynecology” in 2005.

On August 12, 2018, the Indian Fertility Society inaugurated its Telangana State Chapter and Dr. Roya Rozati was appointed as the Telangana State Secretary. She was instrumental in organizing a series of lectures In focused on infertility treatment under the aegis of the Indian Fertility Society Telangana Chapter.

In 2016, Rozati was appointed as the Program Advisor, Royal College Training Program at the Texila American University in South America. She was also appointed as the Co-Guide at the same institution where she serves in both the capacities until date.

Rozati lead and participated in nearly a dozen research projects including the ICMR supported Task Force Study on the Prevalence of Infertility in India.

In 2024, Rozati led the national conference ISSRF 2024 as its Organizing Secretary. The conference brought together India's noted scientists from different verticals and was inaugurated by Telangana Governor Dr. Tamilisai Soundararajan, a gynecologist herself at the Indian Institute of Chemical Technology. She also chaired the talk on "Advancements in |Technologies Related to Reproduction and Fertility" at the ISSRF 2025 held at Jaipur.

== Awards and honors ==
Rozati is the recipient of several awards and honors including the prestigious :

- Rajiv Gandhi Shiromani Award
- Rashtriya Ekta Award by The Global Economic Council, New Delhi.
- Obstetricians and Gynecologists Award by Third World Organization Of Women Scientists
- Honorary Award by National Academy of Medical Sciences
- Best Consultant Award by Mahavir Hospital and Research Center
- Honored as the Convenor to prepare Competency based Guidelines (Syllabus), Minimum Standards requirements by Medical Council of India
- Certificate of Recognition and Appreciation by Economic Times Health World Fertility Conclave (29 January 2019)
- Memorial Oration Award presented by ISSRF (2019)
- Best Chapter Award by the Indian Fertility Society (December 2019)
- Champion Award by ISAR (March 2020)

== Scientific conferences and webinars ==
As the State Secretary of Indian Fertility Society (IFS) Telangana Chapter and the Director for Maternal Health and Research Institute (MHRI), Dr Roya Rozati contributed immensely to medical discourse on infertility and advancements in its treatments and procedures.

In February 2024, Dr. Roya Rozati led the efforts to organize the prestigious 34th annual meeting ISSRF 2024 as its Organizing Secretary. The 3-day Conference was inaugurated by Telangana Governor Dr. Tamilisai Soundararajan at the Indian Institute of Chemical Technology focussed on providing infertility experts, academicians and research scholars in the field of reproductive medicine a platform to exchange recent trends and advancements in fertility and assisted reproduction. The event held significant importance as it brought together "scientific papers, orations, protocols and deliberations on research to help advance the treatment of fertility medicine. ” She leads a Special Interest Group on Endometriosis and has organized and chaired several conferences, symposiums and webinars of national and international repute. In January 2025, she delivered a talk on Impact of Assisted Reproduction on Women organized by Department of Women Education at the Maulana Azad National Urdu University.

- Organized First Annual Congress on “Reproductive Molecular Biology & Assisted Reproductive Technology “Ethics, Regulations & Pioneering Technology (November 5, 2016)
- Conducted ISSRF 2018 -Pre – World Conference Workshop on Assisted reproductive Technology (February 22, 2018)
- Organized World Congress on Reproductive Health with Emphasis on Family Planning and Assisted Reproductive Technology (23rd Feb. to 25th Feb. 2018)
- Organized the 28th Annual Meeting of the Indian Society for the Study of Reproduction and Fertility- (ISSRF-2018)
- Invited as National Faculty for inauguration of Andhra Pradesh Chapter of Indian Fertility Society
- Invited as National Faculty at New Delhi-Medical Therapy on Endometriosis of Indian Fertility Society
- Chairperson and Convenor for webinar series on Endometrioris
- Chairperson and Convenor for webinar series on Managing Infertility in Women
- Delivered talk at the International conference on Challenges and strategies in reproductive and environmental Health with special reference to COVID-19 pandemic
- Moderated The 16th Annual Conference Fertivision and 1st Virtual Global Congress of Indian Fertility Society (IFS) in association with Indian Society for The Study Of Reproduction And Fertility (ISSRF) and CRISPR
