= Zalmai Aziz =

Afghan diplomat

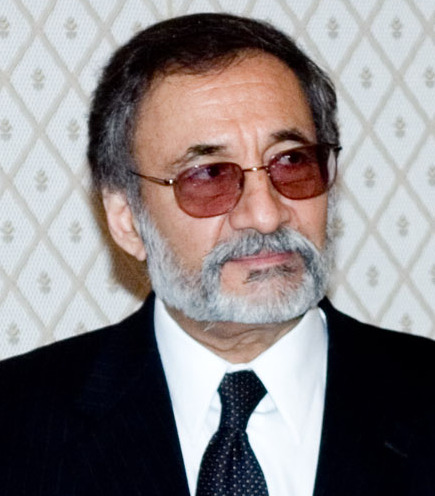

Afghanistan Permanent Representative to the United Nations Office at Geneva
- Incumbent
- Assumed office 13 September 2010
- President: Hamid Karzai
- Preceded by: Nanguyalai Tarzi

Afghanistan Ambassador to Russia
- In office 2007–2010
- Succeeded by: Azizullah Karzai

Afghanistan Deputy Foreign Minister for Political Affairs
- In office 2003–2007
- Preceded by: Abdorrahim Sherizai
- Succeeded by: Mohammad Kabir Farahi

Personal details
- Born: 1940 (age 85–86) Kabul, Afghanistan
- Occupation: Diplomat, Politician

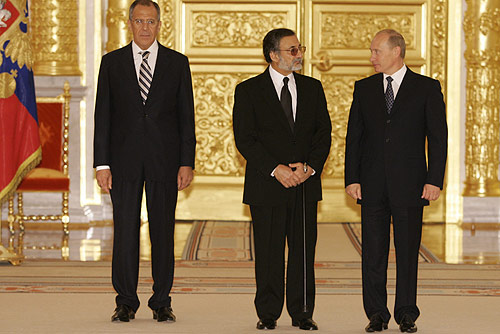
Zalmai Aziz presents his diplomatic credentials to then-President of Russia Vladimir Putin on 27 July 2007.

Zalmai Aziz (born 1940 in Kabul) is an Afghan diplomat and is the current ambassador of Afghanistan to the United Nations Office in Geneva and to Switzerland. He is the former Ambassador Extraordinary and Plenipotentiary of the Islamic Republic of Afghanistan to the Russian Federation and the former Deputy Minister of Foreign Affairs of Afghanistan.

== Education and early career ==
Zalmai Aziz was born on 22 June 1939, in Kabul. He studied International Relations at the University of Kabul and graduated with honours. Aziz joined the Afghan Foreign Ministry in 1966 and since then worked at various departments. He was the second secretary at the Afghan embassy in Warsaw, Poland, in the 1970s and worked at the Afghan mission of the United Nations in New York in the 80s.

== Career in Post-Taliban Afghanistan ==
After the fall of the Taliban Regime in 2011, Aziz returned to Afghanistan at the request of the Afghan Government and rejoined the Ministry of Foreign Affairs. He initially served as the director of the United Nations Department and soon after was appointed Deputy Minister of Foreign Affairs for Political Affairs. He held this position until the middle of 2006. As an Afghan diplomat he has participated in many bilateral and multilateral negotiations and has led Afghanistan's delegations to a number of international conferences and meetings.

In October 2006 Aziz was summoned by the foreign relations committee of the lower house to explain accusations of corruption in various Afghan embassies. Aziz confirmed administrative corruption existed in Afghan embassies in some foreign countries and said the ministry had sent investigative teams to the Afghan embassies in Brussels, Bulgaria, Paris and some other countries.

When Aziz retired in November 2006 Afghan Foreign Minister Rangin Dadfar Spanta said: "Today is indeed a sad day for the Ministry of Foreign Affairs as one of our outstanding and experienced diplomats is leaving us for good; we appreciate all his invaluable hard work and contribution to this Ministry and we all wish him well."

However, in the middle of 2007 Aziz joined the Afghan Foreign Service again. He was appointed Ambassador of Afghanistan to the Russian Federation and also concurrently serving as non- resident Ambassador to the Republic of Moldova, Georgia, the Republic of Belarus and Armenia. In 2008 he said the fight against terrorism in Afghanistan was not the matter of one day, one month or one year, but this ominous phenomenon will take years to be eradicated.

On 25 May 2010 he ended his mission in Russia and was appointed Permanent Representative to the United Nations Office at Geneva and Ambassador to Switzerland. On 13 September 2010, he presented his credential to H.E. Sergei Ordzhonikidze, the Director-General of the United Nations Office at Geneva and on 18 January 2011 to the President of Switzerland. He is a member of the Council of Foundation of the Geneva International Centre for Humanitarian Demining.

Preceded by Nanguyalai Tarzi	Afghan Permanent Representative to the United Nations Office at Geneva; 2010-Present	Succeeded by

Preceded by Ahmad Zia Massoud	Afghan Ambassador to Russia; 2007-2010	Succeeded by Azizullah Karzai

Preceded by Abdorrahim Sherizai	Afghan Deputy Foreign Minister; 2003-2006	Succeeded by
