= Homayoun Seraji =

Iranian engineer

Homâyun Serâji (Persian: همایون سراجی 1947 – 16 April 2007) was an Iranian scientist, engineer, a JPL senior researcher and former professor at Sharif University of Technology who published extensively in the field of multivariable control systems, focusing on optimal control, pole placement, multivariable PID controllers, and output regulation. Also he has significant publications in the field of Robotics, and space exploration.

== Education ==
Seraji was born and grew up in Tehran. He ranked first in the Iranian national high-school diploma examinations in 1965. He then moved to the United Kingdom and studied at Sussex University and majored in Electrical Engineering. Seraji earned his Ph.D. in Control Systems at the University of Cambridge in 1972.

== Career ==
In 1974, he joined Aryamehr University of Technology (now Sharif University of Technology), as a Professor of Electrical Engineering and was involved in teaching and research in control systems for ten years. He was also selected as a United Nations Distinguished Scientist in 1984.

In 1985, Seraji joined NASA's Jet Propulsion Laboratory (JPL) and Caltech. During his tenure at JPL, he conducted extensive research that has led to major contributions in the field of robot control systems, particularly in: adaptive robot control, control of dexterous robots, contact control, real-time collision avoidance, rule-based robot navigation, and safe spacecraft landing.

The outcome of his research in controls and robotics has been published in 98 peer-reviewed journal papers, 119 refereed conference publications, 5 contributed chapters, and has led to 10 patents.

In 2003, he was recognized as the most-published author in the 20-year history of the Journal of Robotic Systems.

== Awards ==
- JPL Edward Stone Award for Outstanding Research Publication in 2003
- NASA Group Achievement Award in 1991 and 2002
- Fellow of IEEE in 1997
- NASA Exceptional Engineering Achievement Award in 1992
- NASA Major Space Act Award

== See also ==
- Science and technology in Iran
