= Homayun, South Khorasan =

Homayun همايون
- Village
- Location within Iran
- Coordinates: 33°25′20″N 59°42′51″E
- Country: Iran
- Province: South Khorasan
- County: Zirkuh
- Bakhsh: Zohan
- Rural District: Afin

Population (2006)
  - Total: 166
- Time zone: UTC+3:30 (IRST)
  - Summer (DST): UTC+4:30 (IRDT)

Homayun (Persian: همايون, also Romanized as Homāyūn) is a village in Afin Rural District, Zohan District, Zirkuh County, South Khorasan Province, Iran. At the 2006 census, its population was 166, in 37 families.
