= Babrak =

Babrak (Pashto: ببرک) is a name found in Afghanistan. It can be a given name or a surname. Notable people with this name include:

- Babrak Karmal (1929–1996), an Afghan communist revolutionary and politician
- Sayyid Akbar Babrak (1921/22 – 1951), an Afghan militant, assassin of Liaquat Ali Khan
- Babrak Khan (fl. 1898 – died c. 1925), an Afghan tribal chieftain, father of Babrak Karmal
