= Dr. Sapir Hospital and Charity Center =

Jewish charity hospital in Tehran, Iran

- Tehran Jewish Committee

Geography
- Location: Iran
- Coordinates: 35.679354°N 51.430995°E

Organisation
- Religious affiliation: Jews

History
- Opened: 1942

Links
- Lists: Hospitals in Iran

The Dr. Sapir Hospital and Charity Center (Persian: بیمارستان و مرکز خیریه دکتر سپیر), a Jewish charity hospital in Tehran, founded by Yaghoub Massaband (Dye Yaghoub), is the largest charity among the religious minorities in Iran. Over 75 years old, the hospital is under the leadership of Siamak Moreh Sedgh. The Tehran Jewish Committee assist in the financial maintenance of the complex, which is owned by the Tehran Jewish Committee. In 2007, The Christian Science Monitor reported that one cause for the recent co-existence between Jews and Muslims in Tehran, "has been gratitude for the Dr. Sapir Hospital."

== History ==
The hospital was first known as Kheirkhah clinic and was opened in 1942. First donors were mostly Jews from the Mulla Hanina Synagogue. Jewish physician Ruhollah Sapir was one of the first physicians of this clinic. Most patients at the time were Jews from Oudlajan neighborhood who were bringing in their children for problems from the poor quality of water. Sapir himself died from Typhus in 1943. Later the clinic turned into a hospital and was named Cyrus the great hospital. Additionally, many gentile Muslims started to be treated in the hospital as well.

After the 1979 Iranian Revolution, the hospital was named in honor of Ruhollah Sapir to Sapir Hospital.

Sapir hospital was instrumental in helping wounded revolutionaries during the Iranian revolution. At the time, most public hospitals would report wounded revolutionaries to SAVAK but Dr. Sapir's hospital was the only hospital that was treating them without informing SAVAK agents. Dr. Sapir hospital's actions were so instrumental that Ayatollah Khomeini himself wrote a personal note thanking the hospital for its help after the revolution succeeded.

== See also ==
- Tehran Jewish Committee
