= Humayun Muhammad Khan =

Pakistani politician

Member of the Provincial Assembly of Sindh
- In office 29 May 2013 – 28 May 2018

Personal details
- Born: 12 April 1965 (age 61) Karachi
- Party: Pakistan Muslim League (N)

Humayun Muhammad Khan is a Pakistani politician who had been a Member of the Provincial Assembly of Sindh, from May 2013 to May 2018.

== Early life and education ==
He was born on 12 April 1965 in Karachi.

== Political career ==
He was elected to the Provincial Assembly of Sindh as a candidate of Pakistan Muslim League (N) from Constituency PS-89 KARACHI-I in the 2013 Pakistani general election.
