= Parisa (given name) =

Parisha
- Gender: Female

Origin
- Origin: Persian
- Meaning: Fairy-like

Other names
- Alternative spelling: Pareesa
- Nickname: Pari
- Related names: Parysatis, Parichehr

Parisā (Persian: پریسا, lit. 'fairy-like') is a Persian feminine given name.

== History ==
The ancient Persian name "Parysatis" (Old Persian: Parušyātiš, Ancient Greek: Παρύσατις) is related to this name. Two notable women with the name "Parysatis" are: Parysatis, who was the wife of Darius II (Persian: داريوش دوم), (Dārayavahuš), king of the Persian Empire and Parysatis II, the youngest daughter of Artaxerxes III of Persia, who was the wife of Alexander the Great.

"Pari" can be used as a diminutive of Parisa, however Pari (Persian: پری, lit. 'fairy') is used as a name of its own right as well. Pari is sometimes incorrectly translated to angel; Fereshteh (Persian: فرشته, lit. 'angel') is a feminine given name that means angel. The Pari (or Peri) in Persian mythology are described to be a race of beautiful and benevolent supernatural fairy beings, earlier regarded as malevolent.

== Given name ==
- Parisa (born 1950), Iranian vocalist and musician
- Parisa Bakhtavar (born 1972), Iranian film and television director
- Parisa Fakhri (born 1975), Iranian actress
- Parisa Fitz-Henley (born 1977), Jamaican-American actress
- Parisa Damandan (born 1967), Iranian art historian
- Parisa Liljestrand (born 1983), Swedish politician for the Moderate Party
- Parisa Mehrkhodavandi, a Canadian chemist.
- Parisa Tabriz (born 1983), Iranian-American computer security expert who works for Google as the VP and GM of Chrome.

== See also ==
- Parisa, Leah's pet purple fox in the American animated television series Shimmer and Shine
