= Kurdistan University of Medical Sciences =

Public university in Sanandaj, Iran

- دانشگاه علوم پزشکی و خدمات بهداشتی درمانی کردستان
- Established: 1986
- Chancellor: Dr. Fereydoon Abdolmaleki
- Administrative staff: 250
- Students: 2,300
- Location: Sanandaj, Iran
- Campus: Urban
- Website: muk.ac.ir

Kurdistan University of Medical Sciences (Persian: دانشگاه علوم پزشکی و خدمات بهداشتی درمانی کردستان) is a public university in Sanandaj, Iran. The university has five faculties including medicine, dentistry, health care, nursing, and paramedicine and 38 Departments within the University Campus offering different courses including B.Sc., B.E., Non-continuous B.Sc., M.Sc., M.Tech., M.D., Specialist, Subspecialist, PhD, PhD by Research, and Postdoc.
