= Shahram Homayoun =

Iranian political dissident and activist

Shahram Homayoun (Persian: شهرام همایون) is an Iranian political dissident, political activist, and the owner of "Channel one," a Persian satellite TV station based in Los Angeles, California that broadcasts into Iran daily.

== Exile ==
Shahram Homayoun fled Iran for the United States in 1991. He was a marked man in Iran, because he supported democracy and human rights and because of his opposition to the Iranian government. He has resided in Los Angeles, California ever since. While in Iran he was the Editor of the "Hamkari" Magazine for two years, Editor of Kargaran (Workers) Magazine for three years, Associate Editor of the daily "Bamdad" (morning) Newspaper for two years. His famous interviews were with Sadegh Ghotbzadeh, Sadegh Khalkhali, Ahmad Khomeini (the son of Ayatollah Khomeini), Ayatollah Shariatmadari, Ayatollah Sadegh Rohani, Yasser Arafat and President of Pakistan General Zia ul Haq.

== Interpol Arrest Warrant ==
According to the Iranian government, Mr. Homayoun "encouraged his audience to engage in acts of terrorism against the Islamic government such as writing slogans (on walls) and resisting the security forces." Independent observers accuse the Iranian government of using Interpol to target political dissidents abroad.

Despite Interpol's "Red Notice" against Homayoun, however, The Federal Bureau of Investigation has assured him that he would be safe as long as he remains in the United States.

== Activities ==
Homayoun has established a Persian satellite TV network based in Los Angeles that broadcasts 24/7 into Iran. The TV channel, named "Channel One," includes programs by Homayoun himself as well as other dissidents and political activists such as Alireza Nourizadeh and Mohsen Sazegara. Abbas Pahlevan, Dr. Danesh Foroughi, Dr. Hassan Rahnavardi, and Dr. Manouchehr Ganji.

He has also started the Ma Hastim movement, which, according to some analysts, has had a "significant influence on Iranian masses," as seen by the "numerous slogans" written on Iran's city walls in its support. He organized alongside other political organizations daily demonstrations in Los Angeles during the 2009 Green Movement in Iran. His TV station and Ma Hastim were instrumental in keeping the Los Angeles demonstrations strong and provided the Western media with all the news coming out of Iran during those days. Recently the Ma Hastim movement, funded by its supporters, built a symbolic cemetery in New York City containing symbolic graves and tombstones of Iranian dissidents and political activists, such as Neda Agha Soltan, killed by the Iranian government since 2009.

== Views ==
Homayoun supports Iranian/Persian nationalism and has been instrumental in keeping Iran's rightful/historical flag, the "Lion and Sun," flying high. This historical flag differentiates between the Islamic Republic's opposition and its cronies. He supports regime change in Iran and believes that the government in Iran should be treated "like South Africa during the apartheid where they were banned from all international organizations, where their sports teams were boycotted, and its officials couldn't travel to the West, and most importantly how their ruling classes assets were seized and frozen abroad."
