= Oudlajan =

Historic neighborhood in Tehran, Iran

Coordinates: 35.6808°N 51.4292°E

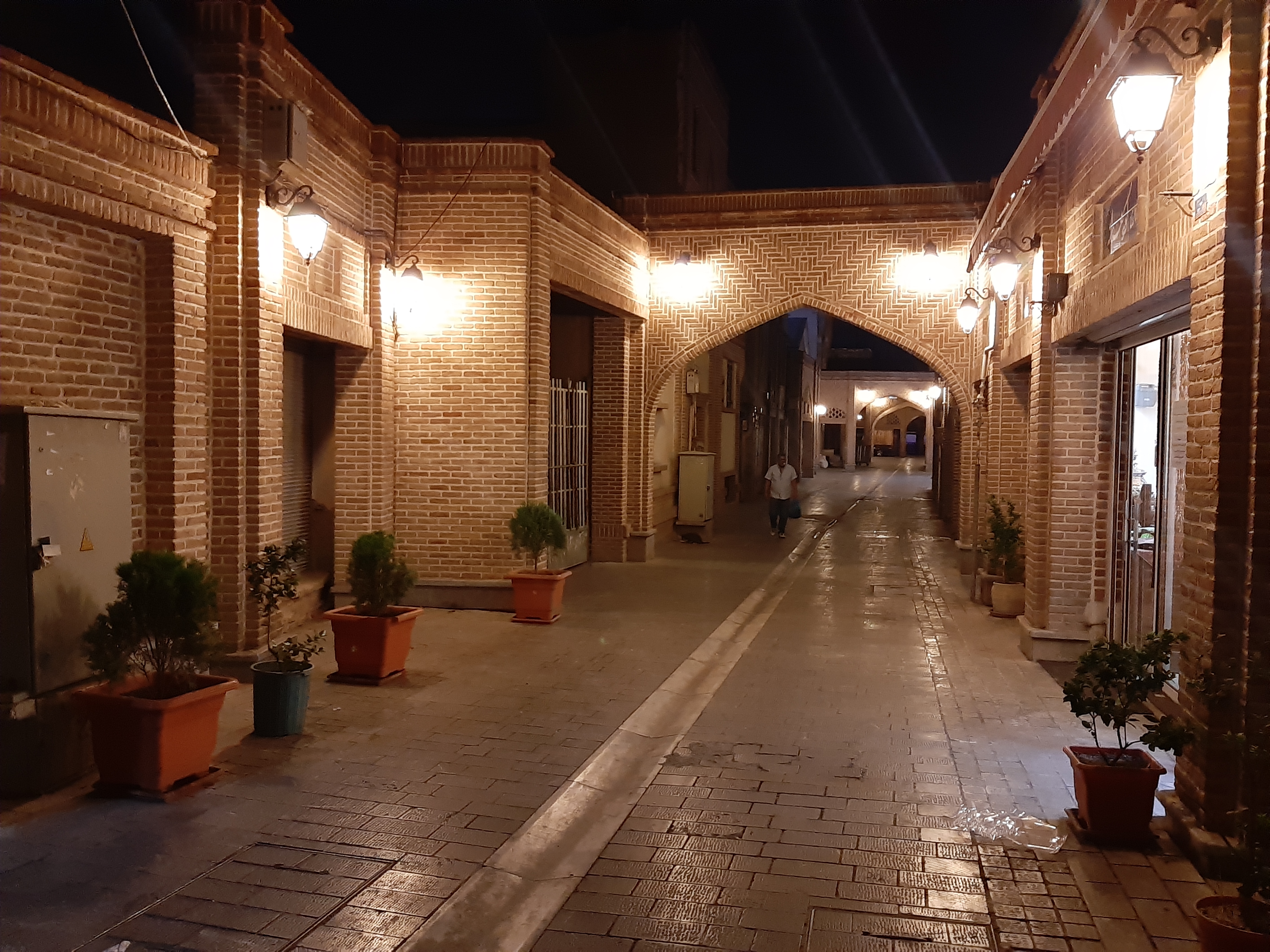
Street in Oudlajan

Oudlajan (Persian: عودلاجان) is a historic neighborhood in Tehran, Iran. The neighborhood is surrounded by Pamenar Street, Cyrus Street (Mostafa Khomeini), Cheragh Bargh (Amir Kabir) and BozarJomehr Street (15 Khordad). Oudlajan, in addition to Arg, Dolat, Sangelaj, Bazar and Chalmeidan, constituted Old Tehran during the reign of Naser al-Din Shah Qajar (r. 1848-1896). Oudlajan consisted of 2619 houses and 1146 shops and was one of the biggest and wealthiest neighborhoods in Tehran.

== Etymology ==
The name Oudlajan in the historic Tati language means 'place for dividing the water'. Some believe that Oudlajan means 'Abdullah Jān' (Dear Abdullah) in a Jewish dialect.

Before the spread of the Persian language, most people of Oudlajan spoke the Tati language.

== History ==
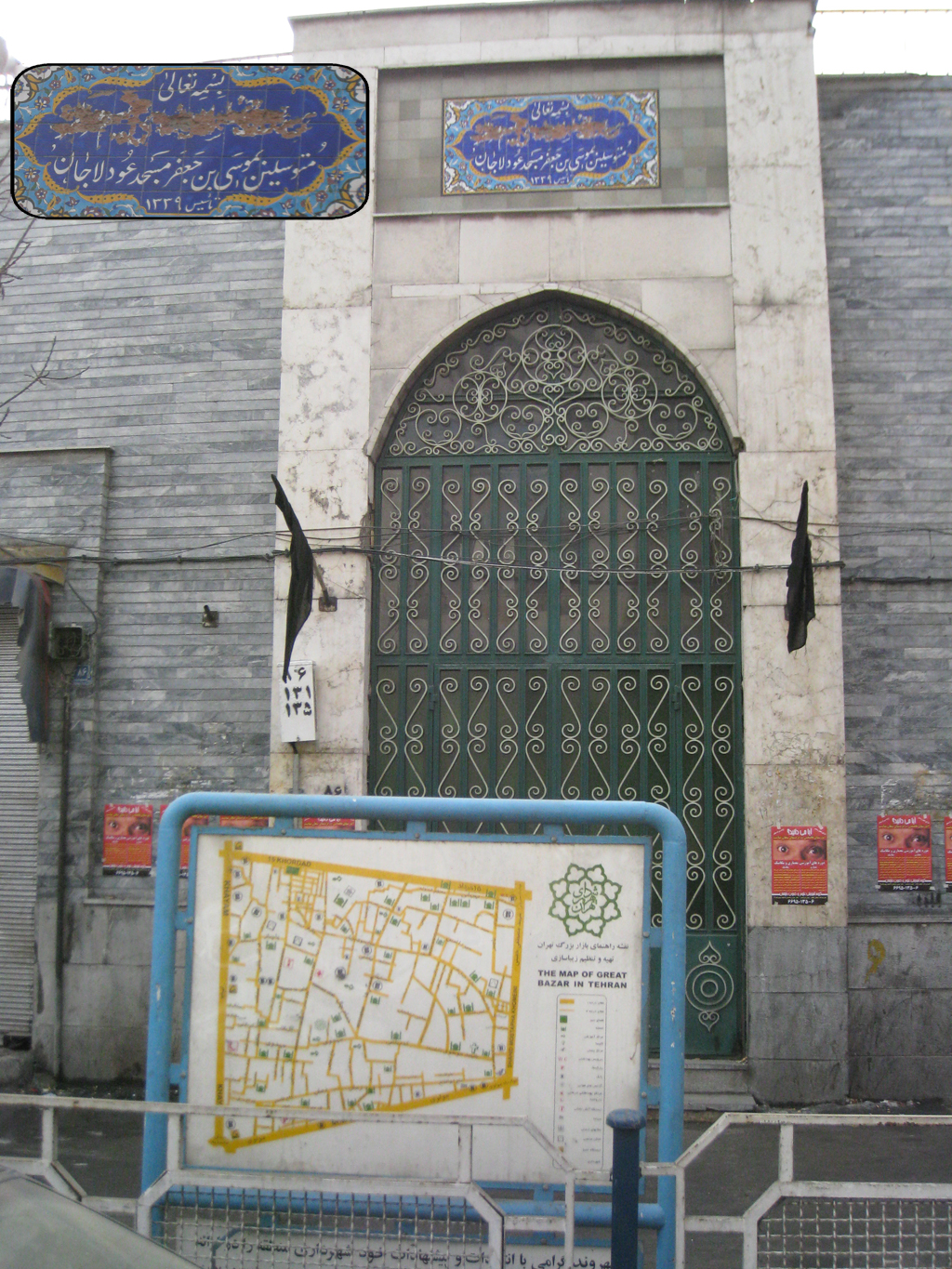
A mosque in Oudlajan

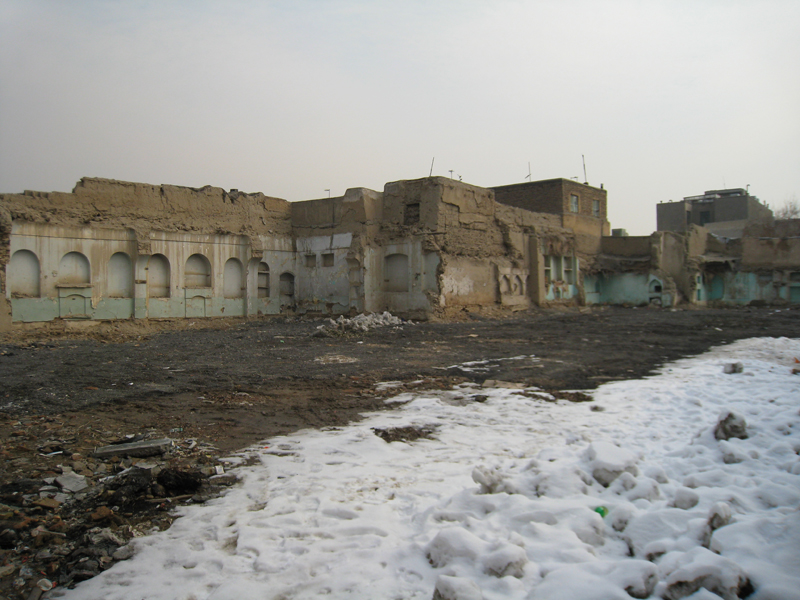
Remains of an old wealthy house

Oudlajan is amongst the oldest neighborhoods of Tehran. Its inhabitants spoke a dialect that was very much akin to that of Shemiran. The neighborhood is situated in the northeastern part of old Tehran. Notable landmarks are the Tehran city fort situated to the north and east of Oudladan, the royal citadel to the west, the Chaleh Maidan neighborhood to the south, and the Bazaar neighborhood to the southwest.

The Jews of Tehran settled in this neighborhood due to the presence of synagogues, ritual baths and availability of kosher meat. Oudlajan was also inhabited by Muslims and hosts significant Islamic religious sites, among them the Tomb of Haft Dokhtaran in the northeast, the Dangi Mosque in the northwest, the Houz Mosque in the southwest, the Abolfazl Mosque and Pir Ata Tomb in the east, and the Montazer al-Mahdi Mosque in the west.

Prior to the Persian Constitutional Revolution, Oudlajan had many synagogues. However, only the Hakim Asher and Ezra Yaghoub synagogues have survived. The synagogues were small and did not stand out visually. They increased in keeping with the expansion of the Jewish population. Some of the old synagogues in Oudlajan were either sold or repurposed over time. It is therefore difficult to estimate the precise number of synagogues in the Qajar era.

Oudlajan counted ten synagogues during Naser al-Din Shah Qajar's reign. One of Naser al-Din Shah's physicians, a Jewish person named Hakim Asher, founded the Kohan Sedgh (Soltan Solayman) synagogue in 1892, which was later renamed the Hakim Asher Synagogue. One of two surviving synagogues of Oudlajan, the Hakim Asher Synagogue is the oldest extant synagogue of Tehran.

Most of the people living in Oudlajan were Jewish. In addition there were Zoroastrians living in Oudlajan. Many famous Iranian politicians such as Qavam family, Mostowfi Family, Nasiroldoleh, Seyyed Hassan Modarres lived in Oudlajan. The houses with many rooms around a yard (with a small pool in the middle) were called Ghamar khanoom houses.

Oudlajan was the wealthiest neighborhood in the Qajar era and kept its status until the Pahlavi era. However, with the big changes in Iranian society in 1340 AH it gradually lost its status. The biggest obstacle to Oudlajan today is the expansion of the Bazar neighborhood. This trend has changed Oudlajan from a wealthy neighborhood into a storage area for Bazar and many old houses were turned into places for addicts.

In the 1940s-1950s, during the reign of Mohammad Reza Pahlavi, as a result of the neighborhood's decline and the growth of Tehran and its enlargement to the north, the Jewish inhabitants of Oudlajan gradually moved to Tehran's northern parts, in particular Bagh-Saba (East), Hasan Abad (West) and its neighborhoods.
