= Homayoun Sameh =

Iranian politician

Homayoun Sameh Najafabadi is an Iranian politician. He has served as the Jewish representative in the Islamic Consultative Assembly since 2020. According to Voice of America, Sameh said in 2024 that "Iranian government aid to the Jewish community's synagogues, schools, restaurants and social clubs has "increased greatly" in recent years."
