= Persian name =

Persian names consist of a given name (Persian: نام, nâm) and a surname or family name (نام‌ خانوادگی, nâm-e khânevâdegi). Given names may be simple or compound and are derived from a variety of sources, including ancient Iranian languages, Persian literature, Islamic tradition, and foreign languages. Hereditary surnames became legally standardized in Iran after 1925 under the Pahlavi dynasty.

== Given names ==
Many Persian names are attested in the Old Persian language and originate in the Achaemenid period, such as Dariosh, Koroush, Setareh, and Apameh. Since the Muslim conquest of Persia, some names in Iran have been derived from Arabic, although the majority are Persian in origin. Persian Christians have Arabic names indistinguishable from those of their Muslim neighbours, except for some explicitly Islamic names such as Mohammad, which are not usually borne by Christians. They can also use Arabic derivations of Christian names (such as saints' names), or Greek, Neo-Aramaic, or Armenian names, as most Christian Iranians are Iranian Armenians, although there are also Iranian Assyrians and Iranian Georgians. Iranian Zoroastrians, meanwhile, often use names of Avestan or Old Persian origin.

Many Persian names originate from the Persian literature book, the Shahnameh or "Epic of Kings". It was composed in the 10th century by Ferdowsi and is considered by many to be the masterpiece of Persian literature.

Approximately 10%–15% of all Persian names are from Shahnameh.[citation needed]

== Last names ==
Before 1919, the Iranian people did not use surnames. An act of the Vosugh od-Dowleh government in 1919 introduced the use of surnames, and the practice expanded during the reign of Reza Shah (r. 1925–1941). Reza Shah passed a law making it mandatory to have surnames. He himself chose Pahlavi as his surname, a name with Sasanian era roots. Before that, a person was often told apart from others by a combination of prefixes and suffixes attached to their name. If it were omitted, that person might be taken for someone else. Since the adoption of surnames, Ahmadi has become the most popular surname in Iran.

Many Iranian families adopted surnames derived from occupations, titles, or social roles. For example, the surname Moazenzadeh (literally "descendant of a muezzin") reflects this tradition, and is notably borne by Salim and Rahim Moazenzadeh Ardabili, both sons of Karim Moazzen Zadeh Ardabili and celebrated Iranian Quran reciters and muezzins.

In many cases people were known by the name of the district, city, town, or even the village from which they came by using the locality's name as a suffix, for example: Tehrani, Tabrizi, Mahabadi, Mazandarani, Kordestani, Zanjani, Ghomi, Piranshahri, Esfahani, Kermanshahi, Ardabili, Hamadani, Yazdi, and Shirazi. The same rule is followed for the many millions of Iranians who have surnames of regions or cities of the Caucasus region. The latter was forcefully ceded in the course of the 19th century to Imperial Russia through the Treaty of Gulistan (1813) and Treaty of Turkmenchay (1828). Examples of common Iranian surnames in this regard are Gharabaghi, Daghestani, Darbandi, Shirvani, Iravani, Ganjavi, Gorjestani, Nakhjevani, and Lankarani.

Among many other secularization and modernization reforms, surnames were enforced by Reza Shah, following similar contemporary patterns in Turkey under Mustafa Kemal Atatürk, and later in Egypt under Gamal Abdel Nasser.

== Common given names ==
=== Male names ===
- Abtin
- Arash
- Ardeshir
- Arya
- Babak
- Bahram
- Behrouz
- Bijan
- Borna
- Dana
- Dariush
- Esfandiar
- Farshid
- Farrokh
- Fereydun
- Hooman
- Houshang
- Iraj
- Jahangir
- Jamshid
- Javid
- Kamran
- Kaveh
- Keyvan
- Khosrow
- Kourosh
- Manuchehr
- Maziar
- Mehran
- Mehrdad
- Navid
- Omid
- Parsa
- Peyman
- Piruz
- Pouria
- Pouya
- Ramin
- Rostam
- Saman
- Shahpur
- Shahryar
- Siamak
- Siyavash
- Zana

=== Female names ===
- Anousheh
- Azadeh
- Bahar
- Behnaz
- Darya
- Delara
- Golnar
- Farangis
- Fereshteh
- Katayoun
- Mahsa
- Mandana
- Manijeh
- Mina
- Mitra
- Nahid
- Neda
- Negar
- Nika
- Niloufar
- Parisa
- Parastu
- Parvaneh
- Pouran
- Roshanak
- Roya
- Rudabeh
- Sepideh
- Setareh
- Shirin
- Simin
- Soraya
- Sudabeh
- Taraneh
- Yasmin
- Ziba

=== Surnames ===
  - Bakhtiari-Renani
  - Bakhtiari-Kordmahaleh
  - Dehkordi
  - Esfahani
  - Jahandideh
  - Kohneh-Lahijani
  - Lajani
  - Lahijani
  - Mirsadeghi
  - Mishdar
  - Nourizadeh Ilami
  - Piranshahri
  - Pishdar
  - Pourlahiji
  - Saki-Lorestani
  - Salehrad ("chivalrous")
  - Sadeghi
  - Sangi
  - Sangini
  - Shajarian
  - Tabatabaei-Saghezi
  - Tabatabaei-Tabrizi
  - Tajerkordestani
  - Tehrani
  - Zinvand-Lorestani

== Name terminology ==
=== Honorifics ===
Most of these refer to Muslim titles or roles in branches of Shia Islam

- Aga Khan, hereditary title of the Imam of the Nizari branch of Isma'ilism. As a suffix, it indicates his children, grandchildren, or great-grandchildren.
- Agha, Sir, mister. It is a general term of respect.
- Ayatollah, high-ranking title given to Twelver Shiʻi clerics.
- Dervish, a mystic or a spiritual guru in Sufism.
- Khan, served at one time as a title for an honoured person.
- Mohyeddin is a personal name for males and as an honorific title in the Islamic tradition.
- Mollah, Muslim cleric. The title has also been used in some Jewish communities to refer to the community's leadership, especially religious leadership.
- Ostad, a master craftsperson, lecturer or a person who is the master of a profession.
- Seyed and sharif, honorific titles that given to men accepted as descendants of Muhammad.
- Shah, "king", short for Shahanshah, "King of kings", meaning emperor
- Seghatoleslam is an honorific title within the Twelver Shia clergy. Seghatoleslam designates narrators whose justice and trustworthiness have been explicitly verified.

=== Prefixes ===
- Haji, one who had made the Hajj to Mecca.
- Jenab, sir, excellency.
- Karbalaei, one who has made the pilgrimage to Karbala
- Mashhadi, one who has made the pilgrimage to Mashhad, often shortened to Mashti, or Mash.
- Mir, generally indicates the person is a sayyid(a) or is of royal descent.

=== Suffixes ===
- -i, the most common suffix used for Persian surnames. They are, in fact, adjectives created by adding the suffix "-i" to person names, location names or other names. Surnames with "-i" are also popular in other countries of historic Greater Persia and neighbouring countries such as the Caucasus, Pakistan, Turkey, Iraq, and Central Asia.
- -ian, like the above case, but with the addition of the plural suffix "-an", common among Iranians and Armenians. Examples are Shaheenian (Persian) and Sargsyan (Armenian).
- -an, similar to English "-s" in "Roberts".
- -pour, "descendant of an Army official (Title)".
- -zad, -zadeh, "descendant of".
- -nezhad, -nejad, " of race/clan (Title)".
- -nia, "His/Her highness (Title)".
- -far, "the light of", see Farr-e Kiyani (Faravahar)
- -bakhsh, "granted by".
- -dad (Old Persian dāta), "given by".
- -ollah, ("of Allah").
- -loo, lou "from".
