= Hooman =

Hooman is a given name and surname. Notable people with the name include:

== Given name ==
- Hooman Barghnavard, Iranian actor
- Hooman Darabi, Iranian-American electrical engineer
- Hooman Khalatbari, Iranian-Austrian pianist and conductor
- Hooman Majd, Iranian-American journalist and commentator
- Hooman Radfar, British-born American investor and entrepreneur
- Hooman Tavakolian, Iranian-American wrestler and coach

== Surname ==
- Charles Hooman (1887–1969), English amateur sportsman
- Harry Hooman (born 1991), English footballer
- Thomas Hooman (1850–1938), English association football player
