= Maziar (given name) =

Maziar or Mazyar (Persian: مازیار) is a Persian masculine forename. Notable individuals with the name Maziar include:

- Mazyar, Iranian prince from the Qarinvand dynasty
- Maziar (1952–1997), Iranian singer
- Mazyar Asadi (born 1979), Iranian photographer
- Maziar Bahari (born 1967), Iranian-Canadian journalist, filmmaker, and human rights activist
- Maziar Behrooz (born 1959), Iranian-American historian
- Maziar Ashrafian Bonab (born 1966), Iranian forensic pathologist
- Maziar Elhami (born 1981), Iranian karateka
- Mazyar Keshvari (born 1981), Iranian-Norwegian politician
- Maziar Kouhyar (born 1997), Afghan footballer
- Maziar Lorestani, Iranian director and actor
- Maziar Miri (born 1974), Iranian filmmaker
- Maziar Partow (1933–2014), Iranian cinematographer
- Maziar Zare (born 1984), Iranian footballer and coach
- Maziar Nekovee (born 1965), Iranian academic, author and inventor
