= Parastu =

Parastu, Parasto, Parastoo, or Parastou (Persian for "swallow") is a feminine given name of Persian origin. Notable people with the name include:

== Given name ==
=== Parasto ===
- Parasto (born 1954), Afghan singer
- Parastoo Ahmadi (born 1997), Iranian artist and singer
- Parastoo Anoushahpour (born 1986), Iranian-Canadian moving image artist
- Parastoo Bakhshi (1989–2024), Iranian physician and cardiology specialist
- Parastoo Golestani (born 1971), Iranian actress
- Parastoo Habibi (born 2002), Iranian para-athlete
- Parastoo Hashemi (born 1980), Iranian-British neural engineer
- Parastoo Salehi (born 1977), Iranian actress and social activist

=== Parastou ===
- Parastou Forouhar (born 1962), Iranian installation artist

== Other ==
- Parastu, an Iranian version of the Beechcraft Bonanza
- old spelling of Barastu, village in Milanlu Rural District, North Khorasan
- Parastu 14 (aircraft), an Iranian trainer aircraft
