= Dilara =

Dilara, Dilyara, or Delara is a feminine given name of multiple origins. In Persian, it consists of two parts: "Del"+"-ara". In Persian, "del" (دل) is a noun meaning heart, and "ara" is a suffix that comes from the Persian verb ārāstan (آراستن), meaning "adorner", "beautifier", or "embellisher". According to the Dehkhoda Dictionary, Dilara can be translated as "she who delights the heart", "she who is pleasing", or "what makes the heart beautiful". It can also be a variant of the Spanish or French habitational name Lara. Notable people with the name include:

== Given name ==
=== Delara ===
- Delara (singer) (born 1997), Norwegian-Iranian singer
- Delara Burkhardt (born 1992), German politician
- Delara Darabi (1986–2009), Iranian woman executed for murder

=== Dilara ===
- Dilara Aksüyek (born 1987), Turkish actress
- Dilara Akter (born 2004), Bangladeshi cricketer
- Dilara Aliyeva (1929–1991), Azerbaijani historian
- Dilara Bağcı (born 1994), Turkish volleyball player
- Dilara Begum (born 1954), Bangladesh politician
- Dilara Bilge (born 1990), Turkish volleyball player
- Dilara Bozan (born 1997), Turkish karateka
- Dilara Büyükbayraktar (born 1989), Turkish actress
- Dilara Choudhury, Bangladeshi academic and political analyst
- Dilara Soley Deli (born 2002), German footballer
- Dilara Fındıkoğlu (born 1990), Turkish fashion designer
- Dilara Buse Günaydın (born 1989), Turkish swimmer
- Dilara Harun (1946–2012), Bangladeshi revolutionary and politician
- Dilara Hashem (1935–2022), Bangladeshi author and novelist
- Dilara Begum Jolly (born 1960), Bangladeshi artist, sculptor, and painter
- Dilara Kaya (born 1991), Turkish basketball player
- Dilara Kazimova (born 1984), Azerbaijani singer
- Dilara Bedia Kızılsu (born 1965), Turkish sport shooter
- Dilara Lokmanhekim (born 1994), Turkish judoka
- Dilara Narin (born 2002), Turkish weightlifter
- Dilara Sak (born 2006), Turkish boxer
- Dilara Özlem Sucuoğlu (born 1998), Turkish-German footballer
- Dilara Türk (born 1996), Turkish-German footballer
- Dilara Uçan (born 2002), Turkish weightlifter
- Dilara Uralp (born 1995), Turkish windsurfer
- Dilara Yurtdaş (born 2004), Turkish artistic gymnast
- Dilara Zaman (born 1943), Bangladeshi actress

=== Dilyara ===
- Dilyara Alkayeva (1949–2026), Russian jurist
- Dilyara Idrisova (born 1989), Russian soprano opera singer and recitalist
- Dilyara Saidkhodjayeva (born 1990), Uzbek tennis player

== Television and film ==
- Dilara, a 2018 Pakistani television series
- Dilara, the leading character portrayed by Aybüke Pusat in the 2021 Turkish dark comedy streaming television series 50M2
- Dilara Giritli, a fictional character portrayed by Sinem Kobal in the 1990s Turkish television sitcom series Dadı
- Dilara Terzioğlu Gürpinar/Erguvan, a fictional character portrayed by Ebru Özkan in the 2014 Turkish television drama series Paramparça

== Other ==
- Aseptis binotata, a moth formerly known as Aseptis dilara and Hadena dilara
