= Sepideh =

Sepideh or Sepid may refer to:

== People ==
- Sepideh (singer) (Sepideh Afshar, born 1975), Iranian-born singer
- Sepideh Fallah, actress in the 2005 film Azadi
- Sepideh Moafi (born 1985), Iranian-American actress and singer
- Sepideh Mohammadian (born 1986), Iranian writer and lawyer
- Sepideh Raissadat (born 1980), classical Persian music singer
- Sepideh Shamlou (born 1968), Iranian writer

== Places ==
- Sepideh, Iran, a village
- Sepid Island, an island of Iran

== Other uses ==
- Sepideh, an album by Mohammad-Reza Shajarian and Mohammad-Reza Lotfi
- Sepid, former name of Sanchi (tanker), a 2008-built crude oil tanker

== See also ==
- Div-e Sepid, legendary character
- Sefid-Rud, a river in Iran
- Sepid Persian Poetry
