= Ibrahim Hasan Murad =

Pakistani educationist

- Born: February 1, 1992 (age 34)
- Occupation: Educationist

Ibrahim Hasan Murad (born February 1, 1992) is a Pakistani educationist, philanthropist and technocrat known for his association with the University of Management and Technology, Lahore. He served as a provincial minister in the caretaker government of Punjab, Pakistan. Murad oversaw four ministries - Local Government and Community Development, Mines and Minerals, Transport and Mass Transit, and Livestock and Dairy Development.

He was served as the caretaker minister of Local Government and Community Development and took various initiatives. He also served as the president of University of Management and Technology (UMT), a private sector university in Lahore.

== Biography ==
Murad is the son of Hasan Sohaib Murad, a Pakistani educationist and founder of the University of Management and Technology. He received his early education in Lahore at the International School of Choueifat.

He received his bachelor's degree in international business from Coventry University and a master's degree in educational leadership and management from the University of Warwick. He also took up a number of courses at the University of Western Ontario.

After completing his education, Murad joined UMT and served as the director of Academic Quality and Assessment. He also helped set up the Institute of Knowledge and Leadership, a talent development institution focused on the MENA region.

In 2018, he was nominated as the president of ILM Trust that oversees UMT and several other educational project. Through ILM Fund, Murad has awarded Rs.10 Billion in scholarships over the past few years.

Murad founded Sitara Hilal Foundation in 2018 to connect Pakistani children with patriotism.

As the minister for Local Government, Murad launched a province-wide youth volunteer registration campaign to improve government-youth coordination that resulted in registering 10,000 volunteers in two weeks.

He was awarded three ministries following a cabinet reshuffle in June 2023. As Minister for Local Government, Murad played a significant role in the turnaround of the department through digitising internal processes and basic public services, a crackdown on corruption, increasing revenue by tens of billions, ensuring better levels of cleanliness across the province and speeding up delayed infrastructure projects. Murad is also a member of the executive committee of the SIFC.

Murad is also a Member of the advisory board of the Markfield Institute of Higher Education, UK and a Member of the Board of Institute of Policy Studies.

He was also appointed as member of Punjab Advisory Council on Governance in 2019. Murad was also the founding chairman of the Pakistan Olympics Association Education Committee.
