= Behnaz =

Behnaz (Persian: بهناز ) is a Persian girl's name.

- Behnaz Akhgar (born 1980), British weather presenter
- Behnaz Jafari (born 1975), Iranian actress
- Behnaz Sarafpour (born 1969), American fashion designer
- Behnaz Shafiei (born 1989), Iranian female motocross rider
