= Sitora =

Ситора
- Gender: Female

Origin
- Origin: Persia
- Meaning: star
- Region of origin: Central Asia

Other names
- Related names: Setareh

Sitora (Uzbek: Ситора) is an Uzbek feminine given name meaning "star". It is related to the Persian name 'Setareh'.

== Notable persons ==
- Sitora Hamidova (born 1989), Uzbekistani long-distance runner
- Sitora Farmonova (born 1984), Uzbek film actress and singer
