= University of Management and Technology (Pakistan) =

Research university in Pakistan

- جامعۂ انتظامیات و فناوری
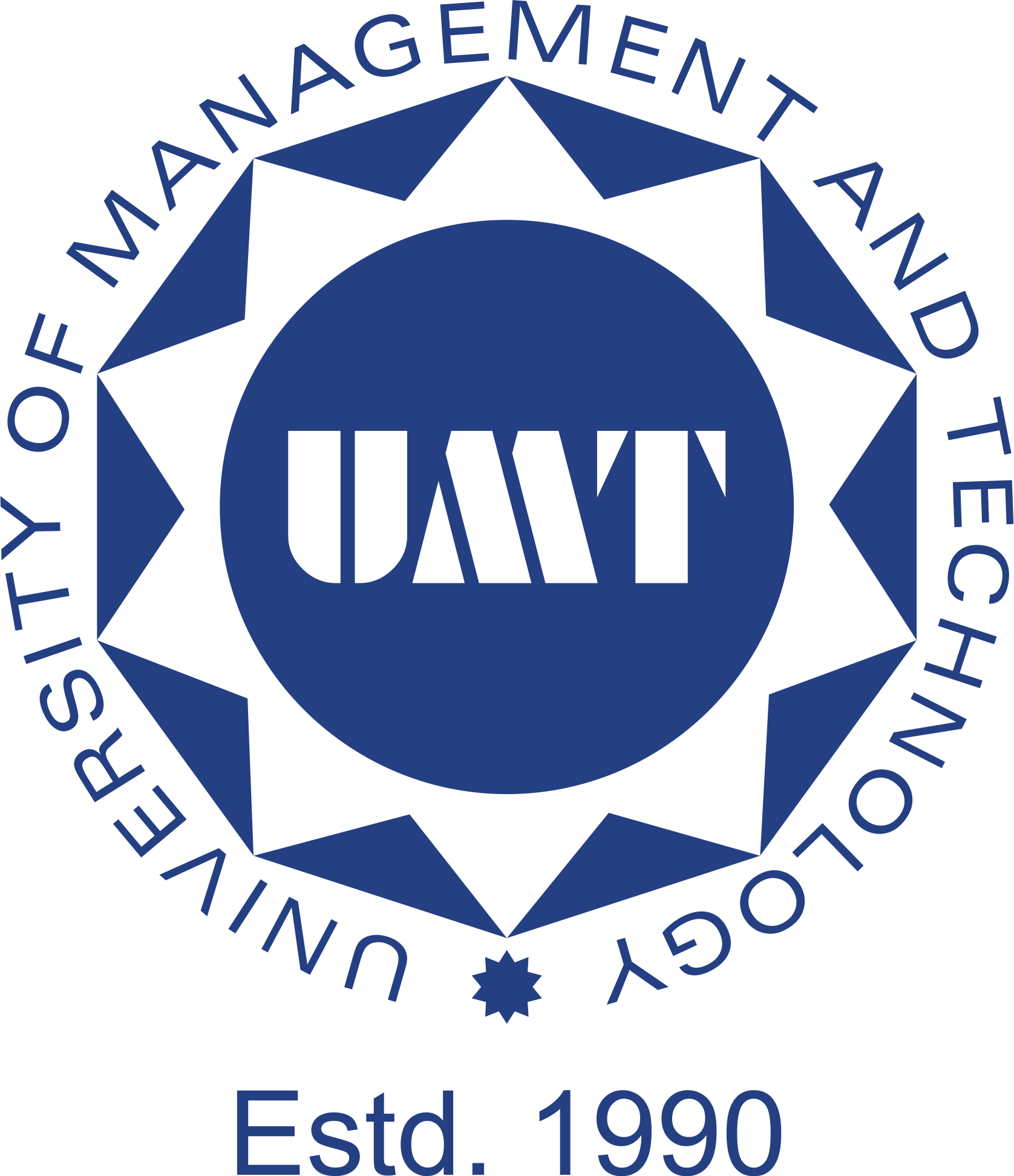
- Great Place, Great Learning, Great Future
- Other name: UMT
- Former names: Institute of Leadership & Management
- Motto: We Transform Learners into Leaders of Tomorrow
- Type: Private
- Established: 1990
- Founder: Dr Hasan Sohaib Murad(Shaheed)
- Accreditation: Higher Education Commission of Pakistan, Pakistan Engineering Council, Pakistan Civil Aviation Authority
- President: Ibrahim Hasan Murad
- Rector: Air Vice Marshal Rtd Dr Asif Raza
- Academic staff: 1000+ faculty members with 300+ PhDs
- Administrative staff: 1,800+
- Students: 23,000+
- Location: UMT Road, C-II, Johar town Lahore; 21-A, Small Industrial Estate. Shahab Pura Road, Sialkot, Lahore and Sialkot, Punjab, Pakistan
- Campus: Urban
- Mascot: UMTian
- Website: umt.edu.pk

The University of Management and Technology (UMT) is among the top ranked private research university located in Lahore, Pakistan. It is chartered by the Government of Punjab, Pakistan and is recognized by the Higher Education Commission of Pakistan (HEC) in the W4 category (highest category), the highest attainable HEC ranking for Pakistani universities. UMT is known for its scholarship program where 22% of the total student body study on some sort of scholarship.

Its international institutional memberships include the Asia Pacific Quality Network (APQN), Asian Science Park Association (ASPA), ACBSP Global Business Accreditation, The Chemical Society of Pakistan, South Asia Triple Helix Association, AACSB Business Education Connected, AMDISA, FUIW, Global Business School Network, International Association of Universities, American Mathematical Society, Pakistan Mathematical Society, PILA, South African Mathematical Society and EFMD Global Network.

== Ranking ==
In June 2023, Times Higher Education (THE) released its World University Rankings 2023 Asia in which UMT was declared the number 1 ranked private sector university in Pakistan. THE ranked a total of 70 Pakistani universities in both the public and private sectors. Overall, UMT was placed at the 116th position in Asia among the 928 universities ranked.

== History ==
UMT is a project of the Institute of Leadership and Management (ILM) Trust, established in 1990. ILM became an independent degree-awarding institution following the grant of charter in 2002 through an Act of the Provincial Assembly of the Punjab, the largest provincial legislature of Pakistan. After the award of charter, it was first named Institute of Management and Technology, however, on June 16, 2004, IMT was renamed the University of Management and Technology through the passing of a similar Act by the Punjab Assembly.

== Academics ==
The university offers more than 150+ bachelor's, master's, and doctoral degree programs in a diverse range of fields such as management, technology, textile design, banking, computer science, economics, education, engineering, aviation, liberal arts, information technology, artificial intelligence, media and communication, languages and mental and physical health sciences.

== Schools and institutes ==
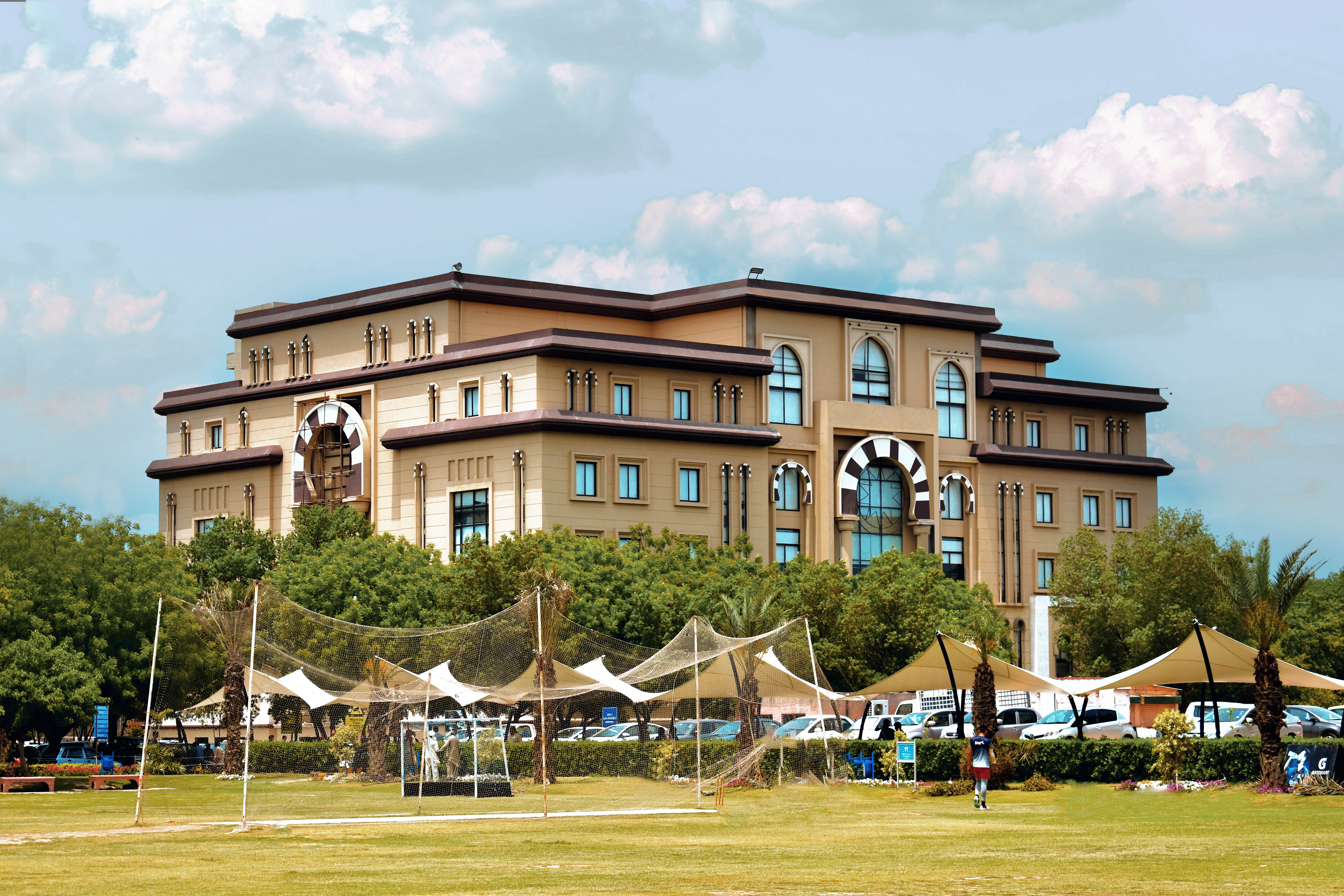
UMT Cohort Building one

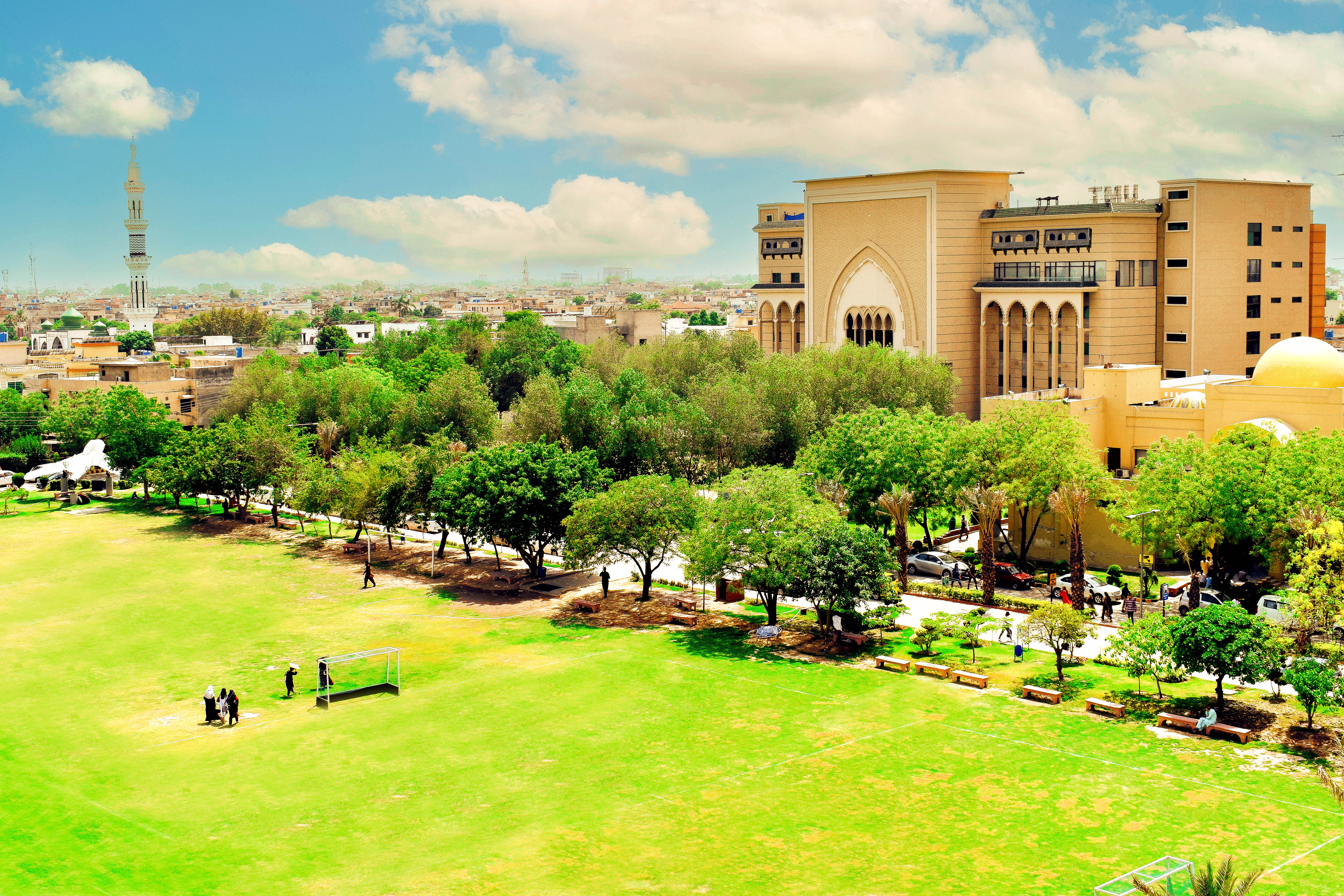
UMT SDT Building

The academic programs at UMT are carried out by 17 schools, 2 institutes and 1 college that collectively contribute towards serving the country's rising demand for quality higher education.

=== Schools ===
Dr Hasan Murad School of Management	School of Professional Psychology
School of Systems and Technology	School of Design and Textiles
School of Social Sciences and Humanities	School of Law and Policy
School of Professional Advancement	School of Engineering
School of Governance and Society	School of Science
School of Commerce and Accountancy	School of Food and Agricultural Sciences
School of Health Sciences	School of Media and Communication Studies
School of Architecture and Planning	School of Pharmacy
School of Liberal Arts	

=== Institutes ===
- Institute of Aviation Studies
- Institute of Islamic Perspectives and Guidance

=== Colleges ===
- The College of Arts Science and Technology

== University campuses ==
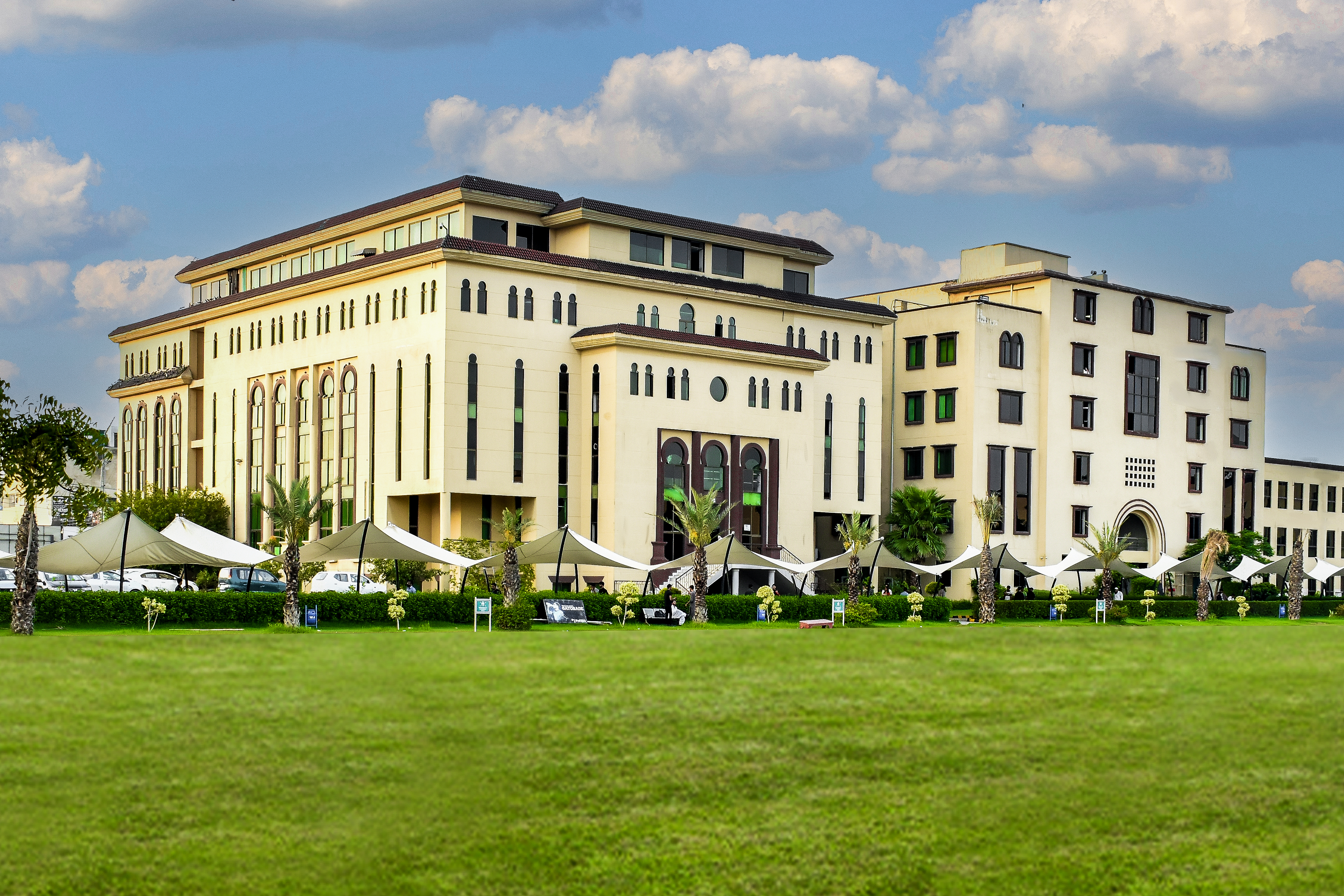
SEN Building UMT

Covering an area of more than 101,171 m^{2} (1,089,000 sq ft), the UMT main campus is located in Lahore's Johar Town. Almost all public transport ply the routes adjacent to the university. The main campus comprises:

- Main Academic Block (commonly referred to as the main building)
- The Library Building,
- The SEN Building
- The SDT Building
- The Administration Building
- UMT Grand Mosque
- " Cohort Building 1"
- " Admin Building"
- " Cohort Building 2 ( Under Construction) ( 2024 Completion Date)*

The campus has a library called the Learning Resource Centre, classrooms, science and engineering laboratories, facilities for indoor/outdoor sports, cafeteria, and Symposium Café (SDT Building and Library Building - Opposite Boys Gate).

UMT has another campuse in Lahore - the Raiwind Campus that houses the School of Health Sciences and the School of Pharmacy.

A sub-campus of the university is located in Sialkot. UMT is the first private sector university to establish an HEC approved sub-campus in Sialkot, a city known for the manufacturing and export of items such as surgical and musical instruments, sports goods, leather goods, and textile goods.

== Clubs and societies ==
UMT has more than 60 active clubs and societies that help fuel the students' desire to engage in cocurricular and extracurricular activities. These outlets provide countless opportunities to students to develop crucial career and communication skills like team-building, teamwork, problem solving, social work and philanthropy etc. and help students develop rounded personalities.

== Sports at UMT ==
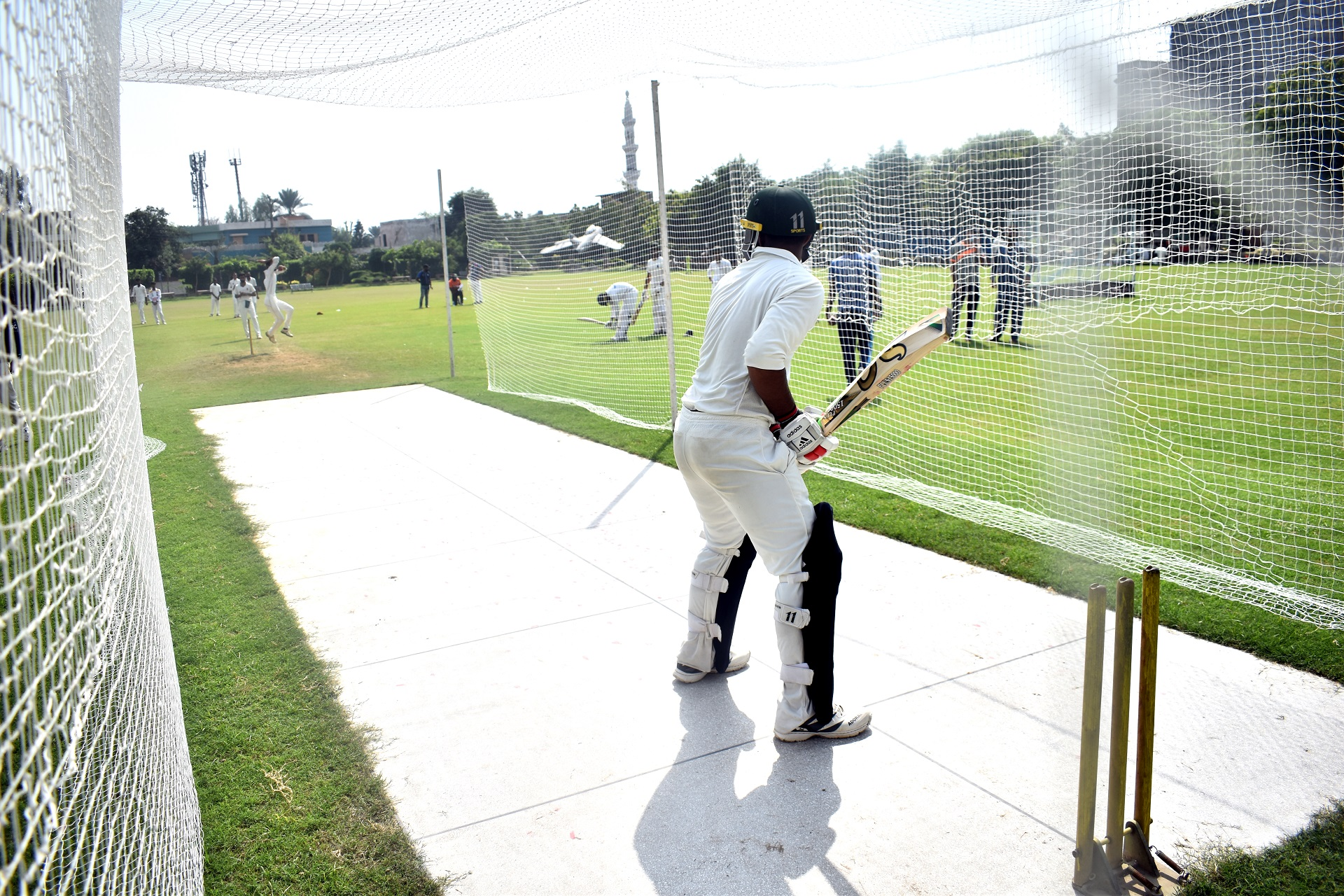
Students playing cricket at UMT.

The UMT Greens lies in the middle of the university premises and is home to many of the sports students engage in. It has provision for sports like cricket, football, field hockey and athletics.

== Learning centres ==
UMT Lahore Campus

- Centre for Knowledge Future
- Centre for Supply Chain Research
- Centre for Globally Responsible Leaders
- Centre for Entrepreneurship and Innovation
- Centre for Mathematics and its Applications
- Centre for Advancement of Systems and Technology
- Centre for Teaching and Learning
- Centre for Enterprise and Technology Advancement
- Centre for Industrial Services and Research
- Centre for Sustainable Development
- Centre for Languages
- Centre for Multidisciplinary Research
- Housing Research Centre
- Institute of Trade and competitiveness

== Journals and publications ==
- Journal of Islamic Thought and Civilization (JITC)
- Islamic Banking and Finance Review (IBFR)
- Linguistics and Literature Review (LLR)
- Journal of Management and Research (JMR)
- Scientific Inquiry and Review (SIR)
- Journal of Art, Architecture and Built Environment (JAABE)
- Organization Theory Review (OTR)
- BioScientific Review (BSR)
- UMT Education Review (UER)
- Clinical and Counselling Psychology Review (CCPR)
- Journal of Communication and Cultural Trends (JCCT)
- Journal of Quantitative Methods (JQM)
- Journal of Finance and Accounting Research (JFAR)
- Empirical Economic Review (EER)

== Notable alumni ==
- Misbah-ul-Haq (Former cricketer, head coach Pakistan national cricket team)
- Sara Naveed (Author)
- Rabi Pirzada (Former Pakistani pop singer, songwriter, television host, artist, and now calligrapher)
- Abdullah Ejaz (Pakistani model and TV actor)
