= Pouria =

Pourya, Poorya, Pooria, Pouria, Pooriya, Porya, or Poria (Persian:پوریا; Avestan: Pouruyô, Pourya; pronounced [puriːjɑː]) a Persian masculine name with the Avestic root Pouruyô, meaning: first; foremost; most ancient.

Notable people with the given name include:

- Pouria Alami (born 1983), Iranian writer
- Pouria Fayazi (born 1993), Iranian volleyball player
- Pouria Norouzian (born 1992), Iranian sports shooter
- Pouria Poursorkh (born 1976), Iranian actor
- Pourya-ye Vali (died 1322), Persian pahlevani champion and poet
