= Iranian National Museum of Medical Sciences History =

Historical museum in Tehran, Iran

- موزه ملی تاریخ علوم پزشکی ایران
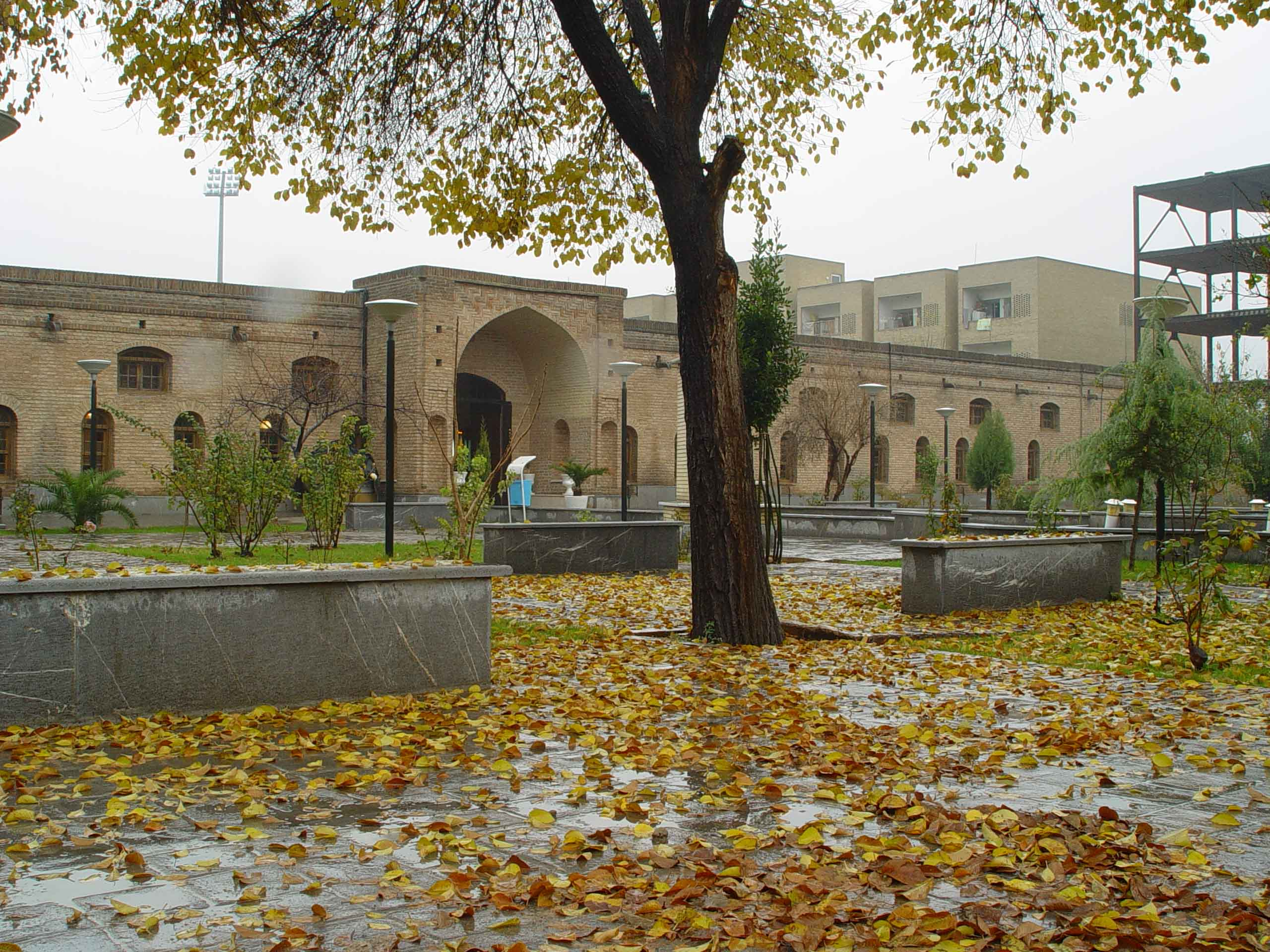
- Established: 1997
- Location: Tehran Province, Tehran, Farshi Moqaddam St, Iran
- Type: Historical museum

The Iranian National Museum of Medical Sciences History is the first medical museum established in Iran by a joint project between the Iranian Cultural Heritage Organization, the Iranian Ministry of Health and Medical Education, Iranian Academy of Medical Sciences, and Tehran University of Medical Sciences.

== History ==
In the spring of 1997, Dr. Maziar Ashrafian Bonab, an academic member of the Iranian national heritage Organization, was appointed as the head of a national project to establish and run the first medical museum in Iran. A building in Amir-Abad area of Tehran selected and offered by the Tehran University of Medical Sciences (TUMS) for this project.

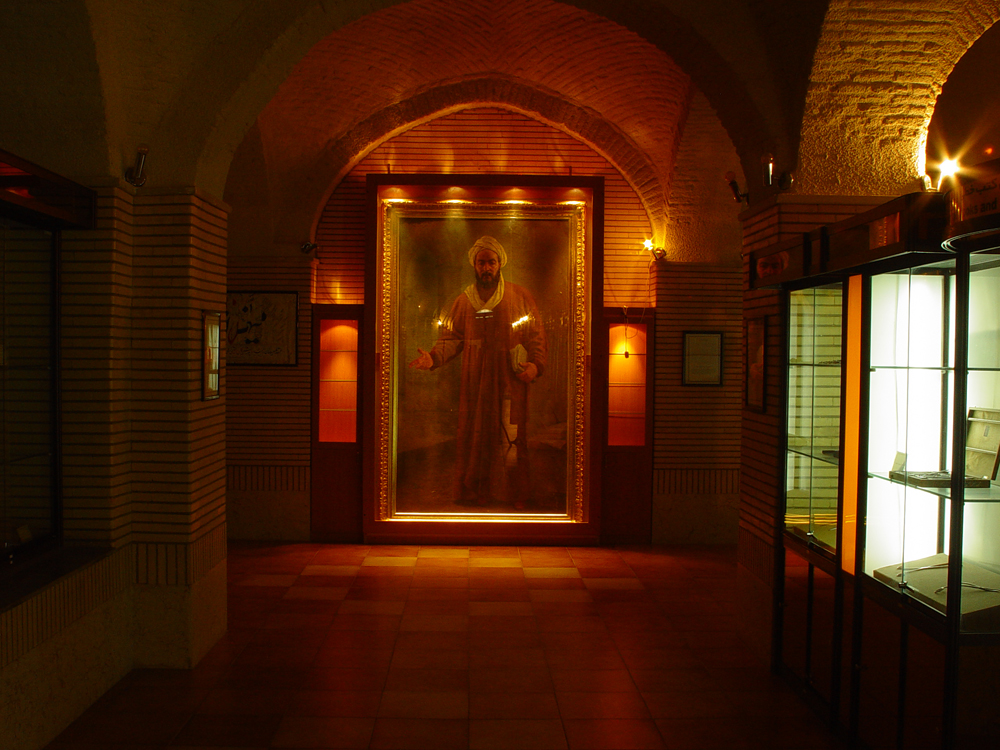
Exhibition room of the Iranian National Museum of Medical Sciences History

The museum was inaugurated in September 2002 .

== Description ==
The museum is jointly operated by ICHO and the Tehran University of Medical Sciences. The building of the museum is located in Amir Abad in Tehran.

== Artefacts ==
- 5000-BC skull of a 13-year-old girl

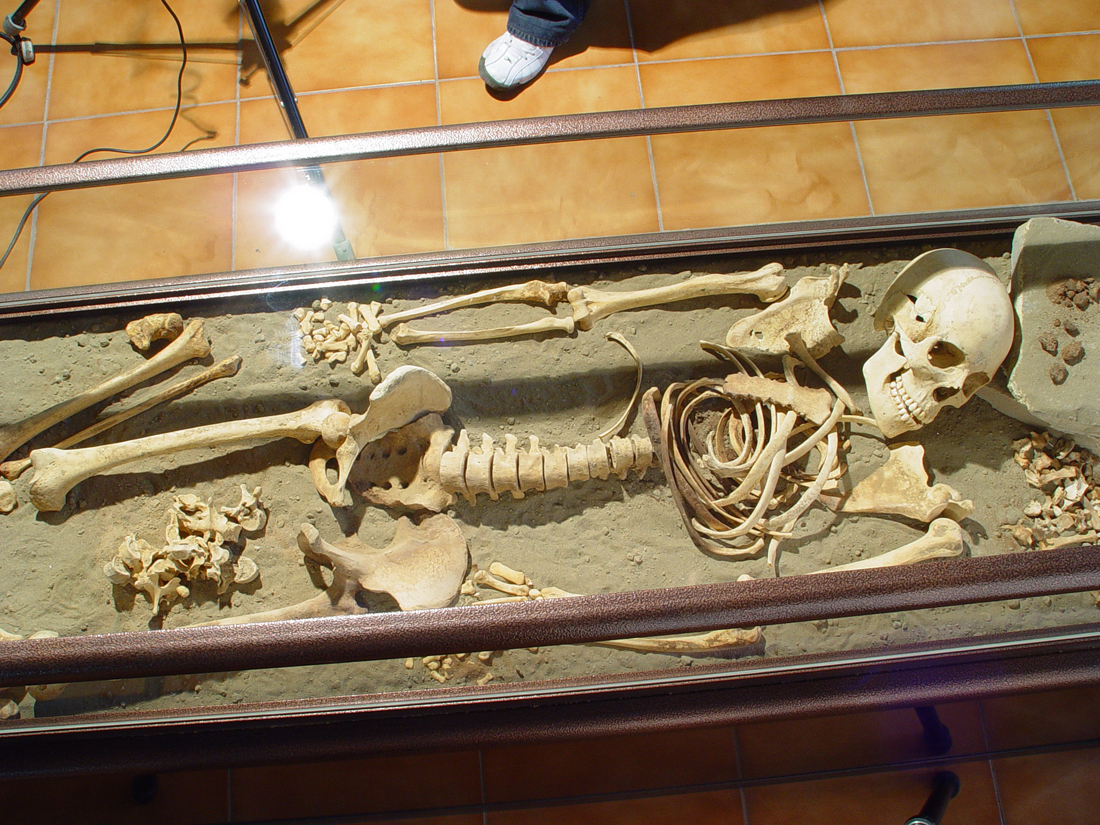

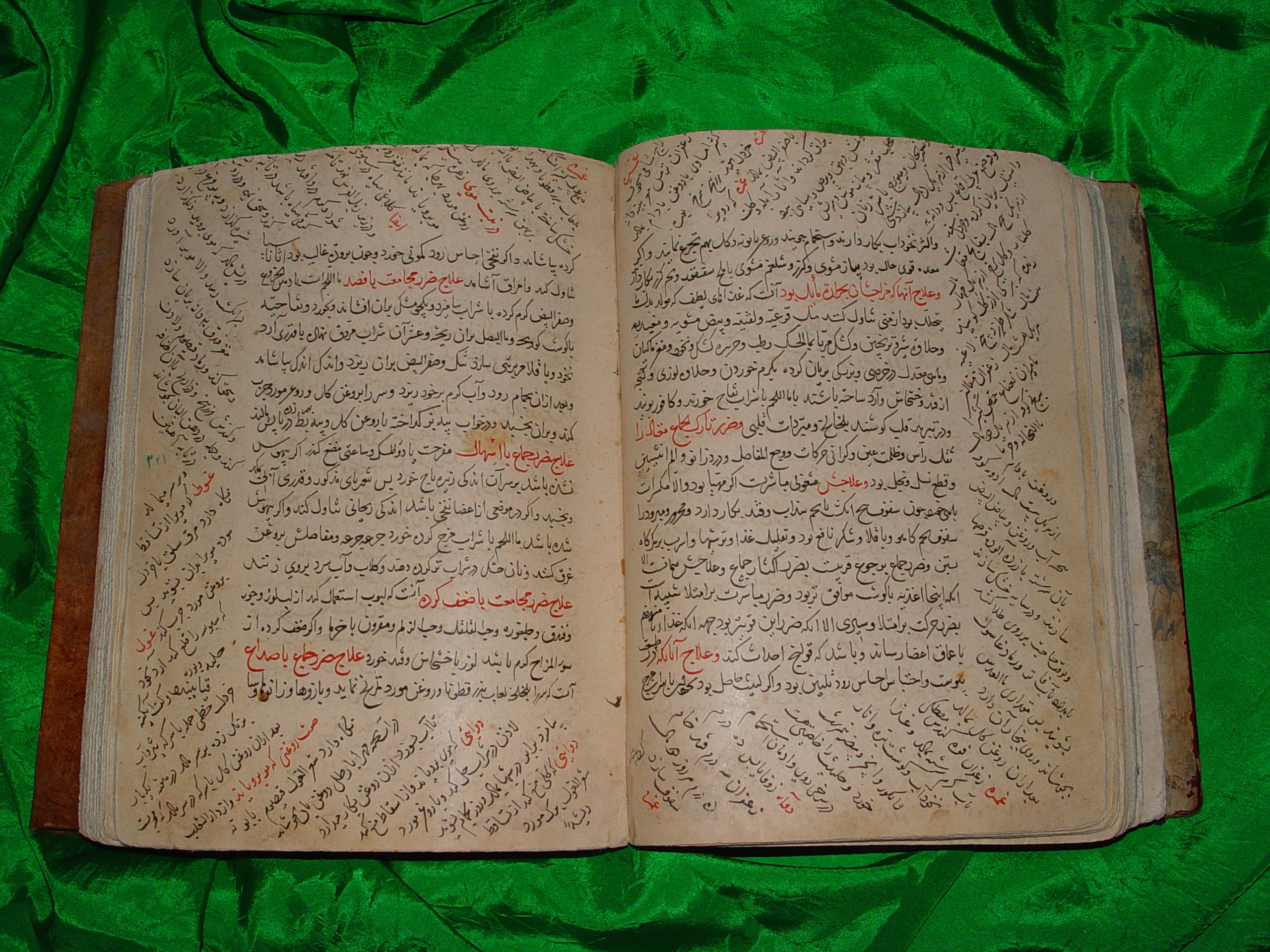

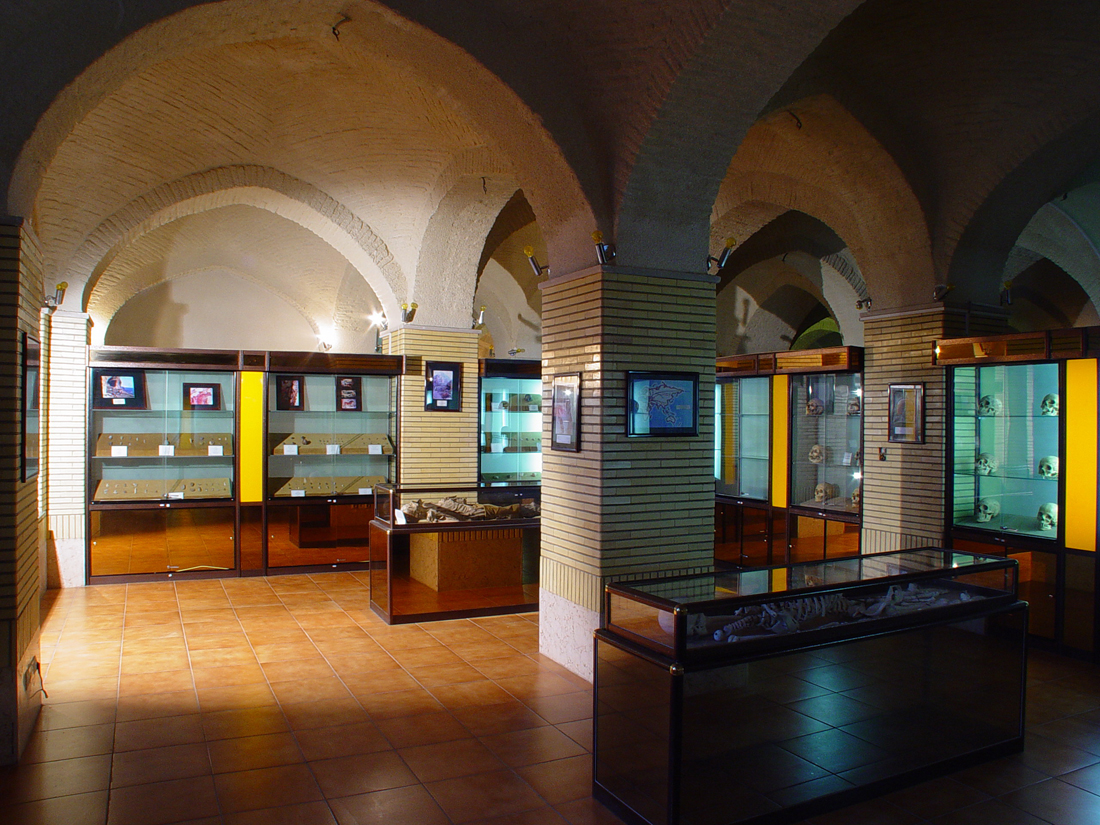

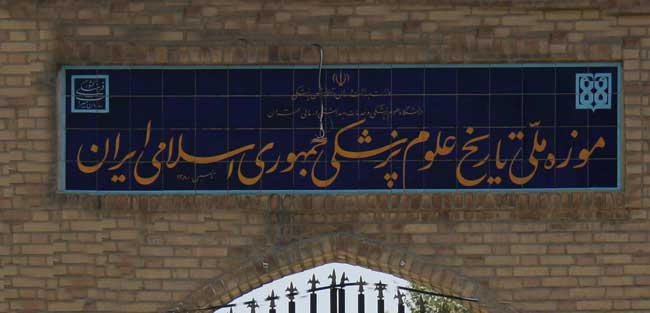
