= Navid =

Navid or Naveed may refer to:

== Technology ==
- Navid (satellite), an experimental Iranian earth observation satellite

== Arts and media ==
=== Music ===
- Naveed (album), a 1994 album by Our Lady Peace
- "Naveed" (song), a 1995 single by Our Lady Peace

=== Fictional characters ===
- Navid Harrid, a character in Scottish sitcom Still Game
- Navid Shirazi, a character in American teen drama 90210

== Politicians ==
=== Naveed as a surname ===
- Anthony Naveed, Pakistani politician
- Rukhsana Naveed, Pakistani politician
- Shakeela Naveed, Pakistani politician

=== Naveed as a first name ===
- Naveed Amir, Pakistani politician
- Naveed Anwar, Canadian politician
- Naveed Dero, Pakistani politician
- Naveed Qamar (born 1955), Pakistani politician

== Sports people ==
=== Naveed ===
- Naveed Ahmed (born 1993), Pakistani footballer
- Naveed Akram (born 1984), Pakistani footballer
- Naveed Nawaz (born 1973), Sri Lankan cricketer
- Naveed Obaid (born 2000), Afghan cricketer

=== Navid ===
- Navid Afkari (1993–2020), Iranian wrestler executed by the government of the Islamic Republic of Iran
- Navid Dayyani (born 1987), Danish footballer and businessman
- Navid Faridi (born 1977), Iranian footballer
- Navid Khosh Hava (born 1991), Iranian footballer
- Navid Maleksabet (born 1991), Iranian squash player
- Navid Mashinchi (born 1989), German-born Canadian soccer player and scout
- Navid Nasimi (born 1995), Ukrainian footballer of Iranian descent
- Navid Nasseri (born 1996), Iranian professional footballer
- Navid Niktash (born 1991), Iranian-French basketball player
- Navid Rahman (born 1996), Canadian-Pakistani footballer
- Navid Rezaeifar (born 1996), Iranian basketball player
- Nawid Mohammad Kabir (born 2001), Afghan cricketer

=== Surname ===
- Mohammad Naveed (born 1987), Emirati cricketer

== Other people ==
=== Naveed as a first name ===
- Naveed Akram (born 2001), Australian, alleged gunman in the 2025 Bondi Beach shooting
- Naveed Jamali (born 1976), American commentator on national security
- Naveed Mahbub, Bangladeshi comedian and columnist
- Naveed Mukhtar, Pakistani army general and spymaster
- Naveed Nour (born 1963), German artist

=== Navid as a first name ===
- Navíd Akhavan (born 1980), Iranian-German actor, also known as Navid Navid
- Navid Kermani (born 1967), German writer and orientalist
- Navid Mohammadzadeh (born 1986), Iranian actor
- Navid Zargari, Canadian electrical engineer

=== Naweed as a first name ===
- Naweed Syed, Pakistani-born Canadian neuroscientist
- Naweed Zaman, Pakistani army general

=== Surname ===
- Asfandyar Abid Naveed, journalist killed in the June 2011 Peshawar bombings
- Hamid Naweed, Afghan-American writer and art historian
- Sara Naveed, Pakistani author
