= Behnaz Shafiei =

Iranian motorcycle racer

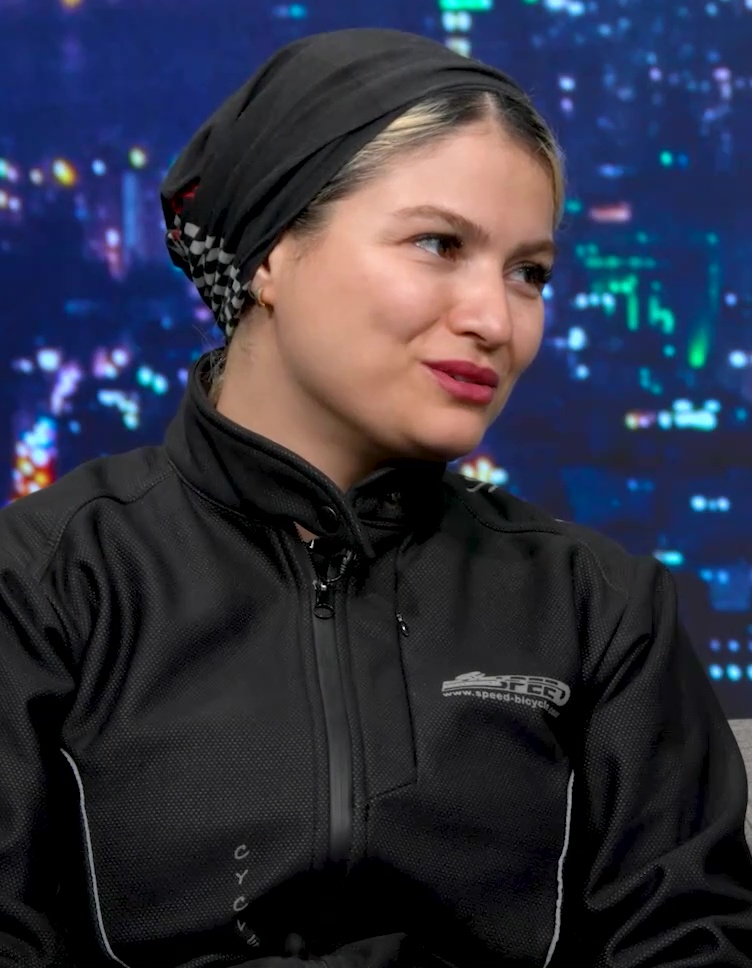
- Shafiei in 2026
- Nationality: (Iran) Iranian
- Born: 18 December 1989 (age 36); Karaj, Iran
- Bike number: 16

Behnaz Shafiei (Persian: بهناز شفيعی; born 18 December 1989) is a motocross rider and road racer from Iran, born and raised in Karaj, near Tehran, Iran.

== Early life ==
Shafiei's obsession started when she was on a family holiday in Zanjan, Iran. She was 15 back when she first time she saw a woman on a motorbike; Shafiei went for one ride and loved it.

Shafiei's coach, Rasoul Najafi, is an Iranian motocross champion and freestyle motorcycle rider. Apart from him, her brother also helps her out on the track. Her mother was also supportive of her passion.

Mahinkhaki said that it was a little strange to see a woman taking up biking but now he sees her potential.

Shafiei got her first bike at the age of 22, a TVS Apache 180cc and used to ride is late in the night dressed up as a boy. She did that for about ten years while going to school in the morning to becomes an accountant.

== Career and recognition ==
In just 2015 and 2016, Shafiei trained over 100 women to drive in the dusty mountain backroads of the desert terrain in Iran. After relentlessly fighting for three years, in February 2017, Shafiei was finally able to influence the Iran's national sports ministry to conduct the country's first female-only race.

Since the Sports ministry said it is not a sport for women, Shafiei trained and increased the number of female riders. Lot of letters were written and visits to the ministry, they finally approved.

Shafiei trains with Javad Zanjani. Shafiei is one among the only six female racers to gained access to amateur tracks in Iran.

Shafiei has spent years calling for more rights for women in Iran. In Iran, women are prohibited from riding motorbikes. In 2023, she said

“I have never understood restrictions for specific genders. There have been so many times when men outdid women in so-called ‘feminine’ activities and women outdid men in ‘masculine’ tasks. The world will be a better place when we abolish this mindset, when we rid the world of gender discrimination and all humans have equal rights. I hope one day all women in Iran and across the Middle East can reach their goals, meet their needs, decide freely for themselves and live happily and carefree.“

== See also ==
- List of Iranian women athletes
