= Mazyar Asadi =

Photographer

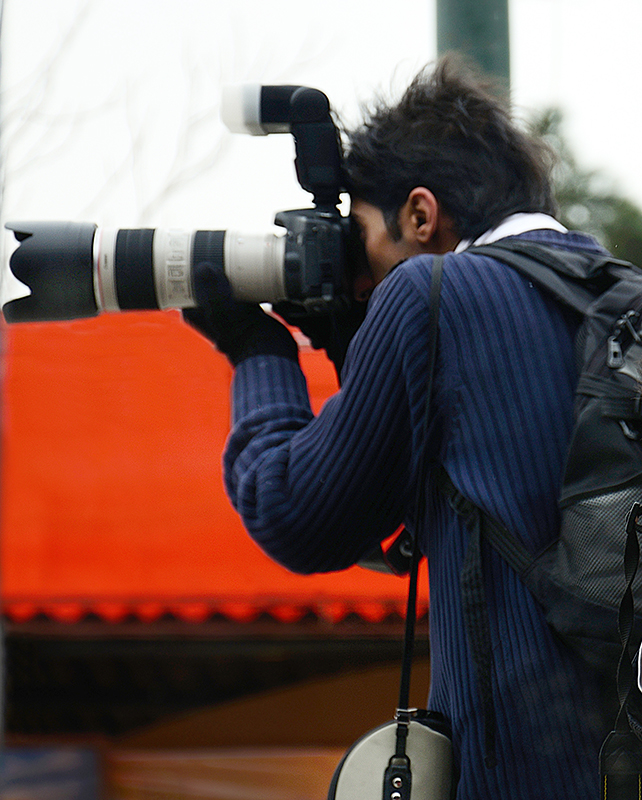
- Born: 1979 (age 46–47); Tehran, Iran
- Education: photojournalism
- Occupations: photojournalist, photographer
- Years active: 2010–present
- Website: mazyarasadi.com

Mazyar Asadi (Persian: مازیار اسدی; born 1979) is an Iranian photographer who resides in Canada and specializes in photojournalism.

He has received more than 40 awards and trophies from contests including a gold medal in Canada, silver medal in Canada (2015), silver medal in Turkey, and bronze medals in Spain and Turkey. He was awarded ribbons and honorable mention awards from Canada, Romania, UK (2014), and Iran.

== Early life ==
Asadi was born in Tehran, Iran. His first work was with major news agencies, websites, and newspapers from 2010. In 2017, he graduated with a BA degree in photojournalism at Tehran News University, in addition to his diploma and Skill Trade Certificates from Iran's Technical and Vocational Training Organization in 2012.

== Career ==
Asadi photographs have been used by news agencies including BBC, The Guardian, Getty Images, Associated Press, CNBC, ABC News, and MSN.

A series of Photo Exhibition by "The Universal Sea" about protecting our sea from pollution, held in the Centre of Polish Sculpture in Oronsko (Poland, 22 April 2018), Baltic Sea Helsinki (Finland, 5–6 June 2018), Pristina (Kosovo 9–10 June 2018), Wattern meer World Heritage Site (Germany, 25 July 2018).

== Honors and awards ==
- 2nd place of the Economics Section, the 7th Doorbin.Net Festival of Photojournalism, 2013, Doorbin, Net Festival, Tehran, Iran
- 2nd place award and trophy, the 2nd Photo Festival of Protecting Environment, 2013, President office, Tehran, Iran
- 1st place award and trophy, the 2nd National Photo Festival of Tourism, 2015, National Photo Festival of Tourism, Tehran, Iran
- 2nd place award and trophy, the 1st Int'l UNESCO Heritage Festival, 2017, UNESCO Heritage, Tehran, Iran
- 1st place award and trophy, the 1st Roholah Photo contest, 2017, Roholah Photo contest. Isfahan, Iran
- 1st place award, the 1st "Alef" International Photo Festival, 2018, Tabriz, Iran.
- 1st place, Merit Award Ribbon, Photojournalism 'Individual' Competition, 2018 from the Canadian Association of Photographic Art (CAPA), Vancouver
- 1st place award, the 1st "Emam Reza" Mashhad Photo Festival. 2019, Mashhad, Iran.
- Bronzed Medal, 43e TROFEU TORRETES DE FOTOGRAFIA – PHOTOGRAPHY 43th TROPHY TORRETES, 2019, TROFEU TORRETES DE FOTOGRAFIA, Barcelona, Spain
- FIAP Silver Medal, Orhan Holding International Photography Contest, 2019, 15th Edition, Bursa, Turkey
- IAAP Gold Medal, Photojournalism section, Toronto International Salon of Photography Contest, 2019, Toronto Camera club, Toronto, Canada
- 1st place award, the 1st "Ghabe Sorkh" Eslamshahr Photo Festival, 2020, Tehran, Iran.
- Finalists of the 17th annual Smithsonian photo contest, 2020, Washington, D.C., United States
- TFSF Bronze Medal, Orhan Holding International Photography Contest, 2020, 16th Edition, Bursa, Turkey

== Publications ==
- Contributed photos for Zoroastrian religious text book, first, second, third, and fourth grade of primary school.
- Documentary photo story book Ashura-Day (44-Pg) Cyprus, Nov 2018, Cine-Books
- Photo in Book The Universal Sea, Pure or Plastic, Mar 2019, The Institute for Art and Innovation
- Alpine Fellowship, Shortlisted, Mar 2019, The Alpine Fellowship
- Co-author of Generations / Generazioni, August 2020 Exhibit Around Books in collaboration with the Assostegno Associazione, Italy

== Exhibitions ==
- Nuclear Deal Photo Exhibition with the Iranian Photojournalism Association, Nov 2015, Iran
- Exhibition "Staying Iranian Art", Georgian National Museum, Jun 2018, Georgia (country)
