= Parvaneh =

Parvaneh (Persian: پروانه) may refer to:

== People ==
=== Given name ===
- Parvaneh Etemadi (1948–2025), Iranian visual artist
- Parvaneh Forouhar (1939–1998), Iranian dissident and activist who was murdered
- Parvaneh Mafi (born 1958), Iranian reformist politician and a member of the Parliament
- Parvaneh Massoumi (1945–2023), Iranian actress
- Parvaneh Milani (1942–2015), Iranian poet, author, translator, and human rights activist
- Parvaneh Pourshariati (born 1959), Iranian-born American historian
- Parvaneh Salahshouri (born 1964), Iranian sociologist and reformist politician
- Parvaneh Soltani (born 1961), Iranian-born British playwright, theatre director, and actress
- Parvaneh Vossough (1935–2013), Iranian physician

=== Surname ===
- Khatereh Parvaneh (1930–2008), Iranian singer
- Tarlan Parvaneh (born 1998), Iranian actress
- Yasmin Parvaneh (born 1964) commonly known as Yasmin Le Bon, English model

== Places ==
- Parvaneh, Isfahan
- Parvaneh, West Azerbaijan
- Dizaj-e Parvaneh, village in East Azerbaijan, Iran
- Kamalvand-e Mohammad Hoseyn Parvaneh, village in Lorestan, Iran

== Other ==
- Parvaneh (film), a 2012 Swiss short film
