= Zana =

Zana may refer to:

== Fictional or mythological characters ==
- Zână (Romanian mythology), a female figure in Romanian mythology
- Zana (Albanian mythology), an Albanian mythological figure
- Zana (Centuria), fictional assassin in the Japanese web manga Centuria

== Places ==
- Diana Veteranorum or Zana, an ancient Roman city in Algeria
- Zana, Burkina Faso, a village in Bam Province
- Zana, Ethiopia, a village near Shiraro in the Tigray Region
- Zana, Florida, a ghost town in Florida, U.S.
- Zana, Uganda, a neighborhood in Ssabagabo Municipality, Wakiso District
- Zana Khan District, Ghazni Province, Afghanistan
- Zaņa Parish, Latvia
- Zaña, a town in northern Peru
- Zaña River. a river in Northern Peru
- Zaña Valley, an archaeological area in northern Peru

== People ==
The name Zana (Kurdish: زانا, lit. 'smart, wise, genius, scientist'), also means handsome in the Yazdi dialect.

- Elias Zana (born 1990), Israeli footballer
- Eric Zana (born 1987), South African rugby union footballer
- Filippo Zana (born 1999), Italian cyclist
- Leyla Zana (born 1961), Turkish Kurdish politician, wife of Mehdi
- Mehdi Zana (born 1940), Turkish Kurdish politician
- Norbert Zana (born 1985), Hungarian footballer
- William L. Zana (born 1966), Retired United States Army major general
- Yossi Zana (born 1957), Israeli footballer
- Zana Akpagu (born 1995), Nigerian academic
- Zana Allée (born 1994), Kurdish-born French footballer
- Zana Berisha (born 1995), Kosovar model
- Zana Briski (born 1966), photographer and filmmaker
- Žana Čović (born 1989), Croatian handball player
- Zana Fraillon (born 1981), Australian writer for children and young adults
- Žana Jereb (born 1984), Slovenian distance runner
- Zana Krasniqi (born 1988), beauty queen and fashion model
- Žana Lelas (1970–2021), Croatian basketball player
- Zana Marjanović (born 1983), Bosnian actress
- Zana Minina (born 1977), Lithuanian sprinter
- Zana Muhsen (born 1965), English author
- Zana Nimani (born 1961), Yugoslav singer with the band Zana
- Žana Novaković (born 1985), Bosnian alpine skier
- Zana Ramadani (born 1984), German politician and feminist activist
- Zana of Tkhina, an Abkhazian "wild-woman" believed by some people to have been a relict hominid

== Other uses ==
- Zana (band), a Serbian music group
- Zana (film), a 2019 Kosovan drama film directed by Antoneta Kastrati
- Zambia News Agency or ZANA, the official Zambian news agency
