= Sara Naveed =

Pakistani writer

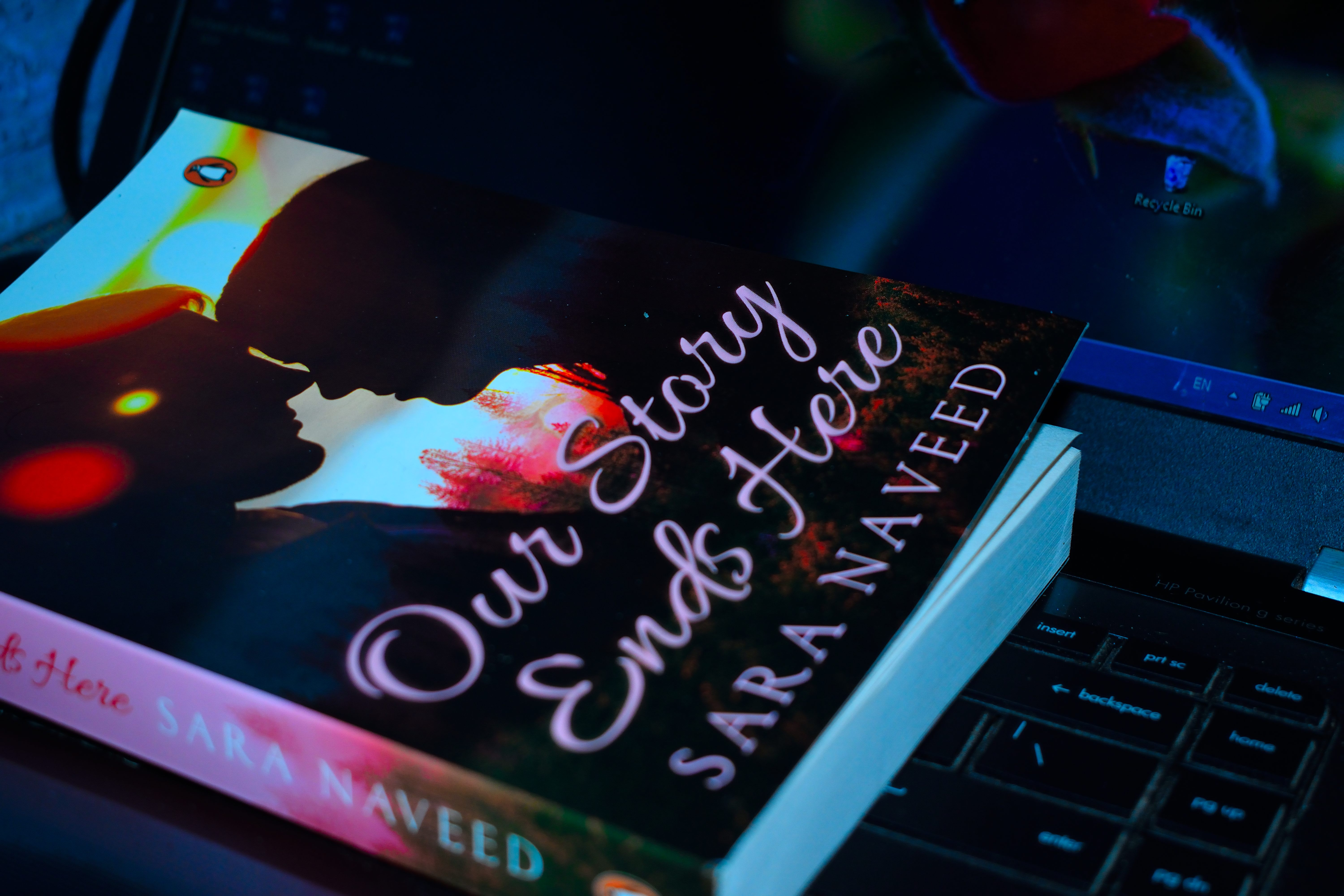
- Book of Sara Naveed (Our Story Ends Here)
- Born: 1 April; Sialkot, Pakistan
- Occupations: Author, Deputy Editor
- Known for: Undying Affinity

Sara Naveed (Urdu: سارہ نوید) is a Pakistani author based in Lahore, Pakistan.

== Biography ==
Sara Naveed was born on 1 April in Sialkot, Pakistan.

Sara Naveed concluded her master's degree with a Gold Medal in Banking and Finance from University of Management and Technology, Lahore.

After completing her matriculation degree from Convent of Jesus and Mary, Sialkot, she opted for pre-medical, but ended up graduating in business. Published in November 2014, Undying Affinity is her debut romance novel.

Her second novel, titled Our Story Ends Here, published by Penguin Random House India, came out on 14 February 2017.

== Work ==
- Undying Affinity
- Our Story Ends Here
- All of My Heart
- The World Between Us
