= Anousheh =

Anousheh (Persian: انوشه) is an Iranian given name for males and females. People named Anousheh include:

- Anousheh Ansari, Iranian-American engineer
- Anousheh Khalili, Iranian-American singer-songwriter

Alternative spellings: Anushae, Anusheh, Anushay, Unushay, Anushè

Anoushak, means immortal in ancient Iran. Anoushak Rappan- Anousheh Ravan ( Immortal Entity )
