= Simin (name) =

- Gender: Female

Origin
- Origin: Persian

Simin is a Persian feminine given name meaning "silvery" and "white". It is derived from the Middle Persian word asêmên.

== Notable people with this given name ==
- Simin Behbahani, Iranian poet
- Simin Keramati, Iranian-born Canadian multidisciplinary artist
- Simin Daneshvar, Iranian writer
- Simin Davoudi, Iranian academic
- Simin Ghanem, Iranian singer
- Simin Tander, Afghan-German singer
