= Parastoo Bakhshi =

Iranian physician

- Born: May 20, 1989; Tehran, Iran
- Died: March 25, 2024 (aged 34); Nurabad, Lorestan, Iran; Ibn Sina Hospital
- Citizenship: Iranian
- Education: Specialist in cardiology
- Alma mater: University of Tehran
- Occupation: Cardiologist

Parastoo Bakhshi (In Persian language: پرستو بخشی) (May 20, 1989 – March 25, 2024) was an Iranian physician and cardiology specialist holding medical council number 149144. She committed suicide due to family problems, work pressure, the compulsory medical service plan, poor working conditions, and salary deficits while residing in the hospital dormitory at Ibn Sina Hospital in Nurabad, Lorestan.

== Biography ==
Parastoo Bakhshi was born in 1989 in Tehran, Iran. She lost both her parents shortly before her death and was sent to fulfill her compulsory medical service with a one-year delay. Despite being placed on the blacklist of the Ministry of Health, no assistance was given to relocate her compulsory service despite her psychological conditions. Only four days after her transfer to Ibn Sina Hospital in Nurabad, her lifeless body was found in her dormitory.

== Death Controversy ==
The suspicious suicide of this specialist doctor cast a harsh light on the disorganized conditions and poor management of Iran’s Medical Council. The government’s compulsory service plan, which places doctors in under-resourced areas with inadequate medical equipment and limited welfare, coupled with insufficient wages for grueling round-the-clock work and dismissive responses from officials to medical staff concerns, has led to a wave of suicides and triggered a significant migration of specialists.

== Autopsy Results ==
Lorestan Judiciary Public Relations announced that the external examination and autopsy were conducted, and toxicology and pathology results confirmed drug poisoning and related complications as the cause of death.

== Reactions ==
- The Deputy of Treatment at Lorestan University of Medical Sciences issued a letter expressing condolences to the medical community and Bakhshi’s family, offering prayers for her soul.
- Ali Salhshoor, Head of Public Relations at the Iranian Medical Council, wrote on his Instagram account:

1- Dr. Bakhshi started her compulsory service with a one-year delay after suffering two major traumas (losing both parents). The Ministry of Health did not help relocate her. 2- A gastroenterology professor at Rahimi Hospital in Khorramabad reportedly insulted and humiliated her. 3- Her salary and that of another cardiology specialist in the compulsory plan were halved due to a letter from the training manager to the hospital administration, leading to this tragic outcome.

- Hashem Moazen-Zadeh, a medical community activist and editor-in-chief of the news base “Doctors and Law,” wrote: “Why does no senior Ministry of Health official resign after the serial suicides of residents and specialists? If such tragedies happened anywhere else, the highest health official would no longer be in office.”
- Mohammad Reza Asadi, a board member of the Tehran Medical Council, wrote on X (Twitter): “Only by investigating the causes of Dr. Parastoo Bakhshi’s suicide can we prevent a domino effect of doctor suicides, which seriously threatens Iran’s healthcare system. Human factors involved must be identified and punished.”
- Pedram Pakayin, Deputy Minister of Health, stated: “Given the explicit judicial statements regarding the cause of Dr. Parastoo Bakhshi’s suicide, those who made hasty and irresponsible comments must be held accountable. Her death was tragic for the health community, but analyzing this incident without sufficient evidence or with a biased view is irresponsible.”
