= Hooman Darabi =

American engineer

Hooman Darabi is a professor and an electrical engineer whose work has focused on radio-frequency (RF), analog, and mixed-signal integrated circuits. He is currently a Teaching Professor in the Department of Electrical and Computer Engineering at the University of California, Los Angeles (UCLA), and a Fellow with Broadcom Corporation.

== Education ==
Darabi received a Bachelor of Science degree in Electrical Engineering from Sharif University of Technology in 1994 and a Master of Science degree in Electrical Engineering from the same institution in 1996.He earned a Ph.D. in Electrical Engineering from the University of California, Los Angeles, in 1999, under the supervision of Professor Asad Abidi.

== Career ==
Darabi joined Broadcom Corporation, where he is currently a Fellow.He has held engineering and technical leadership positions, including Senior Technical Director, and has been involved in the design and development of radio-frequency and mixed-signal integrated circuits for wireless communication applications.

== Research ==
Darabi's research and professional activities have focused on radio-frequency integrated circuits, analog and mixed-signal circuit design, wireless transceivers, and communication systems.He has authored and co-authored technical papers published in engineering journals and conference proceedings; for example, his paper "A Blocker-Tolerant Wideband Noise-Cancelling Receiver with a 2dB Noise Figure," co-authored with David Murphy and colleagues, received the 2012 IEEE Journal of Solid-State Circuits Best Paper Award.

== Honors and awards ==
In 2014, Darabi was named a Fellow of the Institute of Electrical and Electronics Engineers (IEEE) for contributions to radio frequency integrated circuits and systems.

He served as an IEEE Solid-State Circuits Society Distinguished Lecturer from 2012 to 2014.

Darabi has received several awards related to research and publication in the field of solid-state circuits, including the IEEE Journal of Solid-State Circuits Best Paper Award (2012 and 2022) and recognition as a top contributor to the IEEE International Solid-State Circuits Conference (ISSCC) in 2023.

== Selected Publications ==
Darabi has authored and co-authored publications in the fields of RF integrated circuits, wireless transceivers, frequency synthesis, and analog circuit design. His work has appeared in journals and conference proceedings published by the IEEE and other professional organizations, and he has also authored a textbook on RF integrated circuit design.
