= Parastoo Hashemi =

Irani-British neural engineer

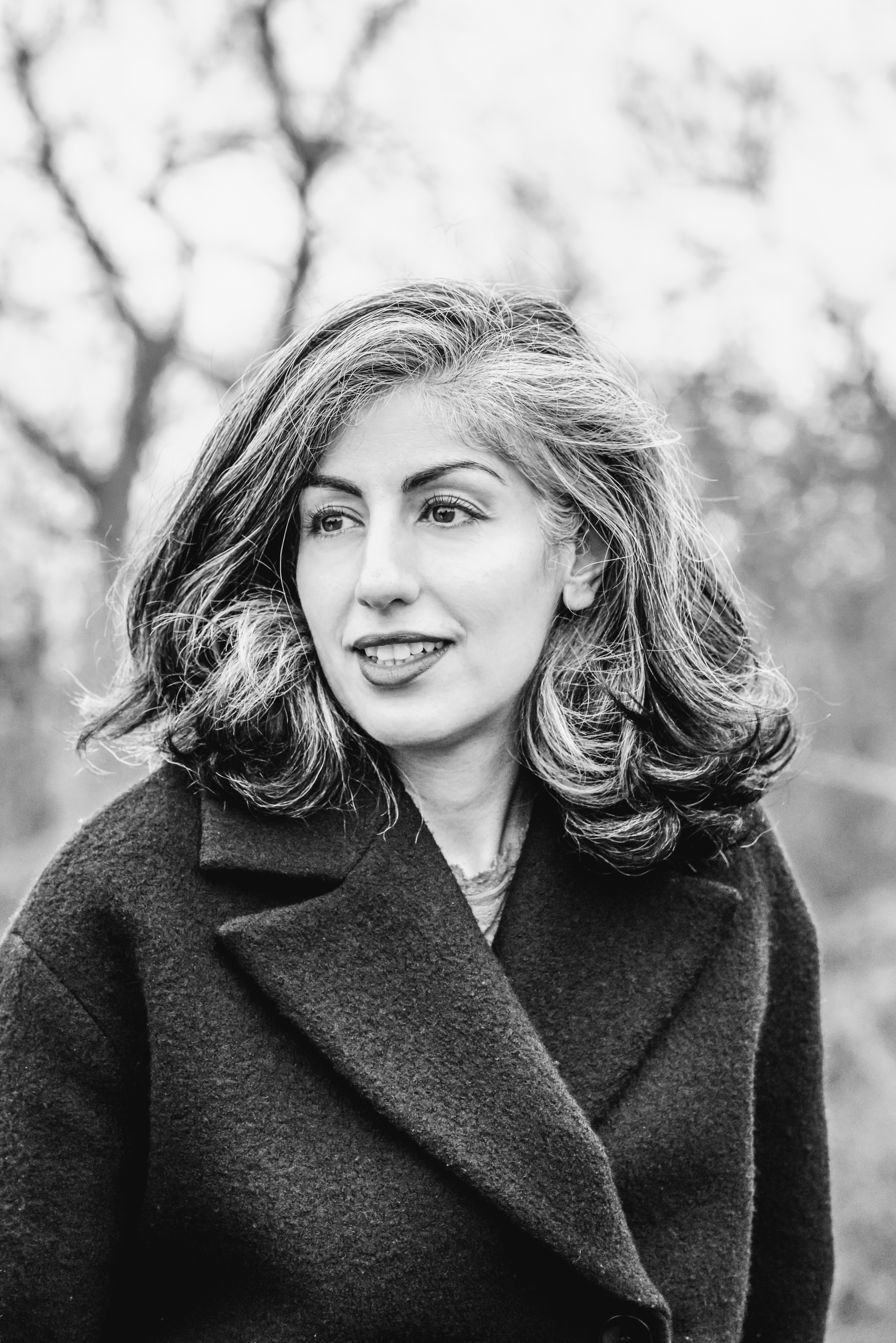
Parastoo Hashemi

Parastoo ("Parry") Hashemi (born 1980) is an Iranian-British neural engineer and Reader in Neural Diagnostics and Therapeutics at Imperial College London. She is best known for her work in the development of electroanalytical methods to quantify neurotransmitters in the brain, and more recently, among the gut-brain axis and skin-brain axis. In 2018, Hashemi received both the Pittsburgh Conference Achievement award and the Royce W. Murray award for her significant accomplishments in electroanalytical chemistry within the first 10 years after receiving her phD.

== Life and academic career ==
=== Early life ===
Hashemi was born in Tehran, Iran and immigrated with her family to the United Kingdom, as a child, in 1986. She grew up in Durham, UK and attended Belmont Comprehensive school and Durham Johnston 6th Form College.

Hashemi graduated with a first class Master in Science (MSci) degree in chemistry from King's College London in 2003. She received her PhD in Bioengineering from Imperial College London in 2007 under the mentorship of Dr. Martyn Boutelle. The focus of her Ph.D. research was to develop online microdialysis techniques for monitoring humans with traumatic brain injury.

Hashemi moved to the United States in 2007 to perform her post-doctoral work with Dr. R. Mark Wightman at the University of North Carolina at Chapel Hill. The focus of her post-doctoral research was to develop a selective method for in vivo detection for brain serotonin.

=== Positions held ===
Hashemi held an assistant professorship in the department of Chemistry at Wayne State University from 2011 to 2015 and in the department of Chemistry and Biochemistry at the University of South Carolina from 2015-2022 where she was tenured in 2017. Hashemi continues to run her lab as a Reader in Brain Diagnostics and Therapeutics in the Department of Bioengineering at Imperial College London since 2019. She is a former associate editor for the Royal Society of Chemistry journal RSC Advances and is currently an editor for ACS Chemical Neuroscience

=== Research ===
Hashemi has pioneered tools for measurements of serotonin in the brain, a neurotransmitter important in the pathology of depression. Her team is using these tools in a variety of models to better understand, diagnose and treat mental disorders, with a focus on depression.

== Notable awards ==
- 2019 CAMS Fellow (Community for Analytical Measurement Science)
- 2018 Society for Electroanalytical Chemistry (SEAC) Royce W. Murray Award
- 2018 Society of Pittsburgh Chemists Pittcon Achievement Award
- 2017 Midwestern Universities Analytical Chemistry Conference Young Investigator Travel Award
- 2017 International Society for Neurochemistry Brain in Flux Symposium Young Faculty Travel Award
- 2017 NSF CAREER Award
- 2015 Eli Lilly Young Investigator Award in Analytical Chemistry
- 2013 Masao Horiba Award for Analytical Chemistry

== Notable papers ==
- Hersey, Melinda; Samaranayake, Srimal; Berger, Shane N.; Tavakoli, Navid; Mena, Sergio; Nijhout, H. Frederik; Reed, Michael C.; Best, Janet; Blakely, Randy D.; Reagan, Lawrence P.; Hashemi, Parastoo (2021-07-28). "Inflammation-Induced Histamine Impairs the Capacity of Escitalopram to Increase Hippocampal Extracellular Serotonin". Journal of Neuroscience. 41 (30): 6564–6577. doi:10.1523/JNEUROSCI.2618-20.2021. ISSN 0270-6474. PMC 8318079. PMID 34083254.
- West, Alyssa; Best, Janet; Abdalla, Aya; Nijhout, H. Frederik; Reed, Michael; Hashemi, Parastoo (2019-02-01). "Voltammetric evidence for discrete serotonin circuits, linked to specific reuptake domains, in the mouse medial prefrontal cortex". Neurochemistry International. Brain in Flux-III. 123: 50–58. doi:10.1016/j.neuint.2018.07.004. ISSN 0197-0186. PMC 7448101. PMID 30031052.
- Abdalla, Aya; West, Alyssa; Jin, Yunju; Saylor, Rachel A.; Qiang, Beidi; Peña, Edsel; Linden, David J.; Nijhout, H. Frederik; Reed, Michael C.; Best, Janet; Hashemi, Parastoo (2020). "Fast serotonin voltammetry as a versatile tool for mapping dynamic tissue architecture: I. Responses at carbon fibers describe local tissue physiology". Journal of Neurochemistry. 153 (1): 33–50. doi:10.1111/jnc.14854. ISSN 1471-4159. PMC 7279511. PMID 31419307.
- Jin, Yunju; Dougherty, Sarah E.; Wood, Kevin; Sun, Landy; Cudmore, Robert H.; Abdalla, Aya; Kannan, Geetha; Pletnikov, Mikhail; Hashemi, Parastoo; Linden, David J. (2016-08-17). "Regrowth of Serotonin Axons in the Adult Mouse Brain Following Injury". Neuron. 91 (4): 748–762. doi:10.1016/j.neuron.2016.07.024. ISSN 0896-6273. PMC 4990493. PMID 27499084.
- Atcherley, Christopher W.; Wood, Kevin M.; Parent, Kate L.; Hashemi, Parastoo; Heien, Michael L. (2015-01-27). "The coaction of tonic and phasic dopamine dynamics". Chemical Communications. 51 (12): 2235–2238. doi:10.1039/C4CC06165A. ISSN 1364-548X. PMC 4825181. PMID 25249291.
