= Pouria Alami =

Iranian journalist and writer

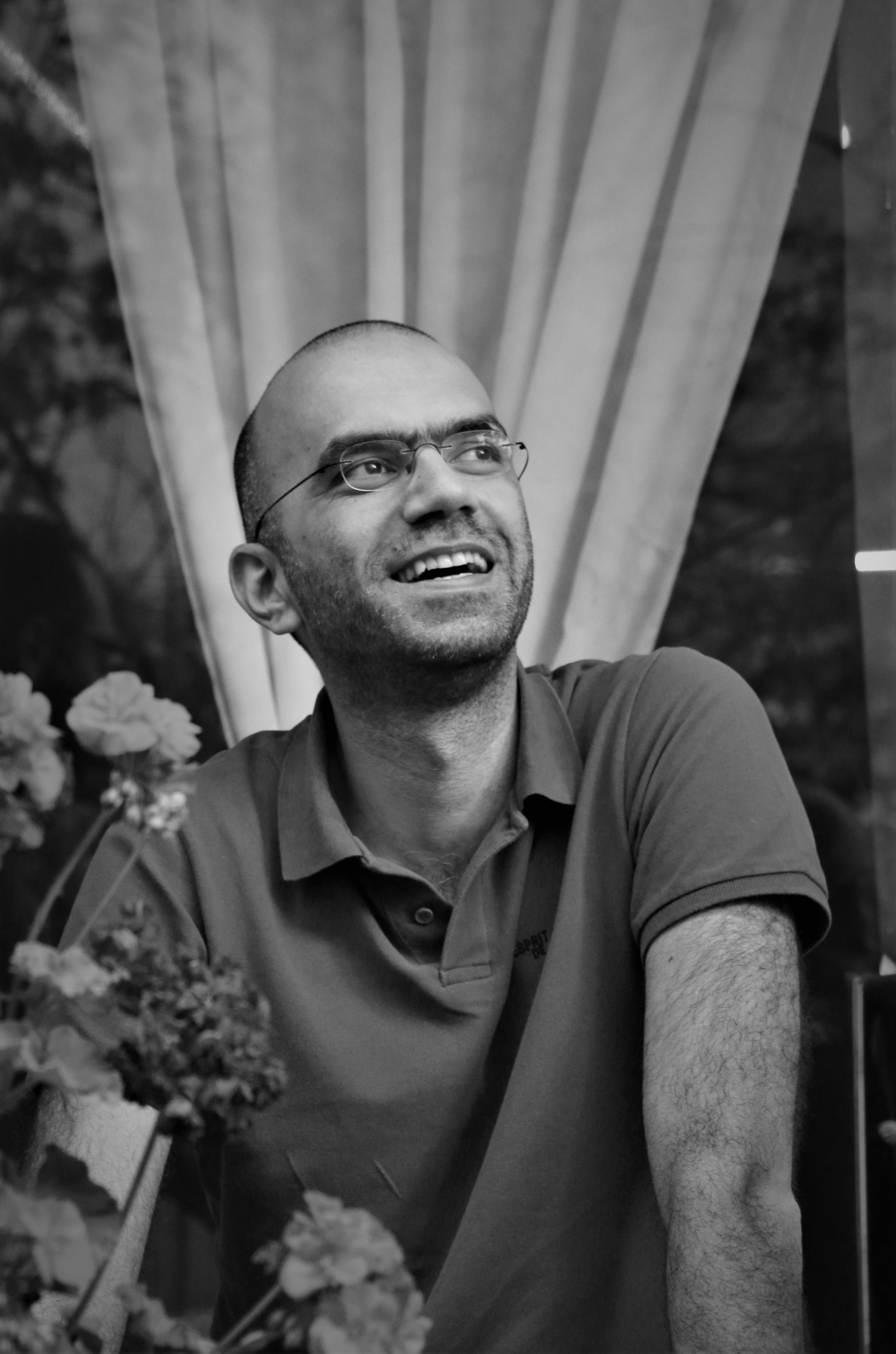
- Born: 23 February 1983 (age 43); Tehran, Iran
- Occupation: Writer
- Spouse: Zahra Omrani
- Children: 1
- Writing career
- Notable work: A Treaty for Drinking Tea
- Notable awards: Hooshang Golshiri Literary Awards (nominated)
- Literary movement: Persian literature, Writing political satire, Writer of children's books

Pouria Alami (Persian: پوریا عالمی; born 23 February 1983 in Tehran) is an Iranian writer, satirist, journalist and writer of children's books. He is best known for his satirical columns in Iranian newspapers during the decades of 2000s and 2010s. The Coachman (Persian: کاناپه‌چی, Canapeh-chi), The Elevatorman (Persian: آسانسورچی, Asansor-chi) and The Adventures of Midoon and Sophia are some of his most popular columns which are later on published in book formats, too. In addition, he has published some collections of short stories and poems in Iran.

Alami said farewell to the world of journalism in 2019. He has continued his cultural activities as a writer of children's books in iGhesseh (iGhe3) Startup, and also as editor-in-chief in Radio Gousheh.

== Professional life ==
Alami did not continue his studies after graduating from high school. While he was a high school student, he worked as a librarian in the public library of Shahryar and the culture house of Shahrak Andisheh. He started writing for magazines such as Nourooz and Gol-Agha during these years.

In 2003, he designed and published his first mind game named Red Riding Hood, a combination of comic strips, story-telling, game maps, and storybooks, illustrated by Bozorgmehr Hosseinpour. At the same time, he worked as a layout designer for Gol-Agha monthly and then as art manager of several magazines and newspapers.

He self-published his first book, Half an Hour Before Seven in Tehran and then became the writer, head of writers, and editor-in-chief of the cultural radio programs of Radio Tehran until 2009.

An overview of Tahmasb's collection by Pouria Alami is published in the book: Three Tales by Iraj Tahmasb.

== Activity in the press ==
In the same year, he started writing two columns, Coffee Reading and Rajab's Mother, in the new period of E’temad Melli Newspaper which brought him a reputation. At the same time, he was the manager of the satire section of Shabnameh, the first daily satire page in Persian press, in E’temad Melli Newspaper.

As a result, his reputation as a satirical columnist was established. Columns such as The Coachman (Canapeh-chi), The Elevatorman (Asansor-chi), The Adventures of Midoon, and Sophia are some of his most popular columns.

In 2000, while he was a junior in high school, Pouria Alami began his official collaboration as a librarian and writer at Gol-Agha Cultural Institute. The same year, he started his journalistic work in Nourooz Newspaper, Hamshahri Newspaper and Gol-Agha Magazine. His career in this period mainly consisted of writing satirical columns for newspapers and magazines. Some of these columns became so popular that they were published as books later. For a while, he worked as editor of games and designer of table games in Children Gol-Agha Magazine.

During his years of journalistic work, Pouria Alami has also written poetry and fiction. His novel, The Window Dies Sooner, was nominated for Hooshang Golshiri Prize, one of the most prestigious literary prizes in Iran. He has published several poetry collections too. A Treaty for Drinking Tea is one of his most famous poetry collections. Nonetheless, most of the books published by Alami are compilations of the satirical columns he had written for various newspapers.

== Imprisonment ==
In February and March 2013, Alami was arrested by Iran Ministry of Intelligence and imprisoned for 32 days in Evin Prison.

== Other activities ==
He is the founder and CEO of two platforms, iGhe3 and Radio Gousheh.

Inaugurated in 2018, iGhe3 is a mobile and web platform for producing children's stories in Persian. Alami is both the manager and the writer of the iGhe3 City series on this platform.

== Works/Publications ==
- Alami, Pouria (2014). "Totally Harmless". World Literature Today. 88 (2): 35–37. doi:10.7588/worllitetoda.88.2.0035.
- Pouria Alami has also contributed to several publications including Diary of a Wistful Man by Edik Boghosian which is a compilation of 365 Persian short poems.
