= Pouya (name) =

Pouya or Pooya or Puya (Persian: پویا) is a male first name of Iranian origin (from a Persian word meaning "dynamic", "in move" or "searcher"). Pouya or Pooya or Puya is not a unisex name in Iran. Notable people with the name include:

== First name ==
- Pouya Jalili Pour, Iranian-born singer, born 1976
- Pouya Bakhtiari, Iranian protester, born 1992
- Pouya Idani, Iranian chess-player, born 1995
- Pouya Norouzinejad, Iranian handball-player, born 1994
- Pouya Saraei, Iranian composer, born 1983
- Pouya Khazaeli, Iranian architect
- Pouya Seifpanahi, Iranian footballer, born 1986
- Pouya Tajik, Iranian footballer, born 1980
- Poya Asbaghi, Swedish-Iranian football manager, born 1985

== Last name ==
- Ashkan Pouya, Swedish Serial Entrepreneur, born 1976
- Kevin Pouya, known mononymously as Pouya, American rapper, born 1994
- Mahdi Puya, Iranian Islamic scholar in Indian Sub-continent, (1899–1973)
