= Taraneh =

Taraneh (Persian: ترانه) is an Iranian feminine given name meaning "melody" or “song”.

People named Taraneh include:

- Taraneh Alidoosti (born 1984), Iranian actress
- Taraneh Boroumand, Iranian playwright, writer, poet, and translator
- Taraneh Hemami (born 1960), Iranian-born American visual artist
- Taraneh Mousavi (1981–2009), Iranian abuse victim
