= Sepideh Mohammadian =

Iranian writer and lawyer

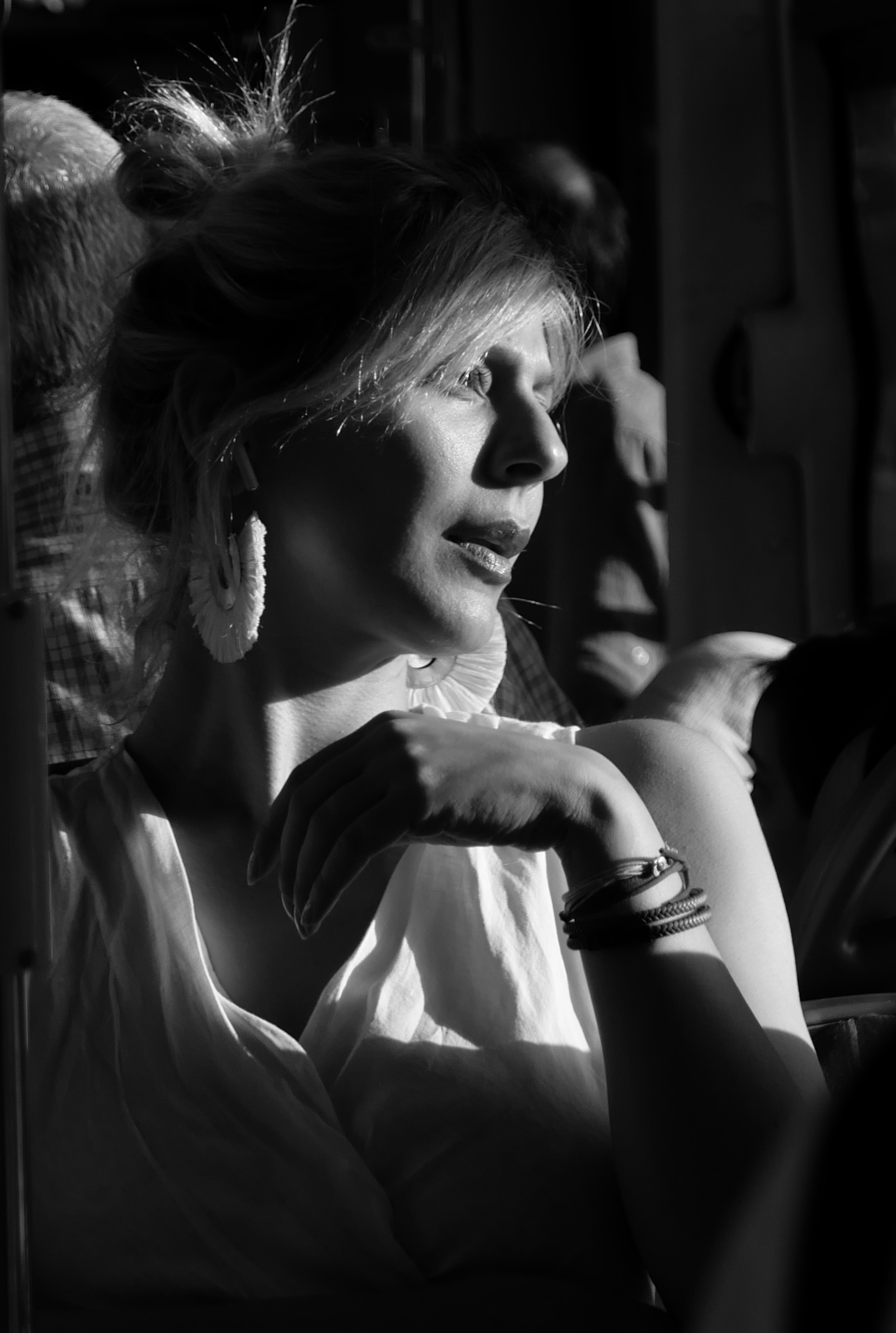
sepidehmohammadian

Sepideh Mohammadian (born March 29, 1986) is an Iranian writer. Her writings are mostly fiction about women living in contemporary Iran and the various problems they face. A lecture at Iranian Studies of Stanford University in 2015 concerning “Women In Contemporary Literature of Iran, Seeking Meaning and Awareness".

== Writing ==
- Born on August 16, Roshangaran and Women Studies Publishing: 2016 - this is the story of a mother with an autistic child, emotional struggles from the mother's perspective and about the human condition.
- The Story of Haava and The Ear of Wheat, Roshangaran and Women Studies Publishing: 2012 - loosely based on a true story about honor killings.
- Coming, Staying and Leaving, Roshangaran and Women Studies Publishing: 2010 - a collection of eight short stories about birth, life and death.
- The 40th Day, Roshangaran and Women Studies Publishing: 2010
- The Assembly of The Forgotten, Damoon Publishing: 2007 - banned from being published by the Iranian Ministry of Culture and Islamic Guidance,
- Downhill To Hell, Damoon Publishing: 2007 - banned from being published by the Iranian Ministry of Culture and Islamic Guidance
- Character, Moral Criterion and Compulsive Situations In Asghar Farhadi’s Cinema - co-authored research with sociologist Dr. Parviz Ejlali, about Asghar Farhadi’s Cinema

Additionally a collection of audiobooks with readings in Persian by the author have been created.

In 2014, she worked on writing a screenplay for a theatre performance, "A Little Consciousness", which was directed by Hadi Sarvari and performed at Vahdat Hall in Tehran, Iran. The play was about physically disabled children in Iran.
