= Sangi (surname) =

Sangi is a Pakistani and Nivkh surname that may refer to the following notable people:

- Ali Gul Sangi (1952–2014), Pakistani poet, author, political activist, and journalist
- Sohail Sangi (born 1953), Pakistani journalist and activist
- Vladimir Sangi (born 1935), Nivkh author, publisher, and language activist
