= Setareh =

Setareh, ستاره
- Gender: Female

Origin
- Origin: Persian
- Meaning: star, destiny

Setareh or Setare (Persian: سِتاره) is a feminine given name of Persian origin meaning "star" or "fate".
Its equivalent in Tajik and Uzbek is Sitora.

It is related to the name 'Tara', "star" in Sanskrit, Hindi, Urdu, Marathi, Persian, Punjabi, Kurdish, Bengali, Telugu and Sinhala.
It is also related to the names Stella ("star" in Latin), Estelle (cf. the French "étoile") and their derivatives.

== People ==
Notable people with the name include:

- Setareh Eskandari (born 1974), Iranian actress
- Setareh Pesyani (born 1982), Iranian actress
