= Hooman Radfar =

American entrepreneur and investor

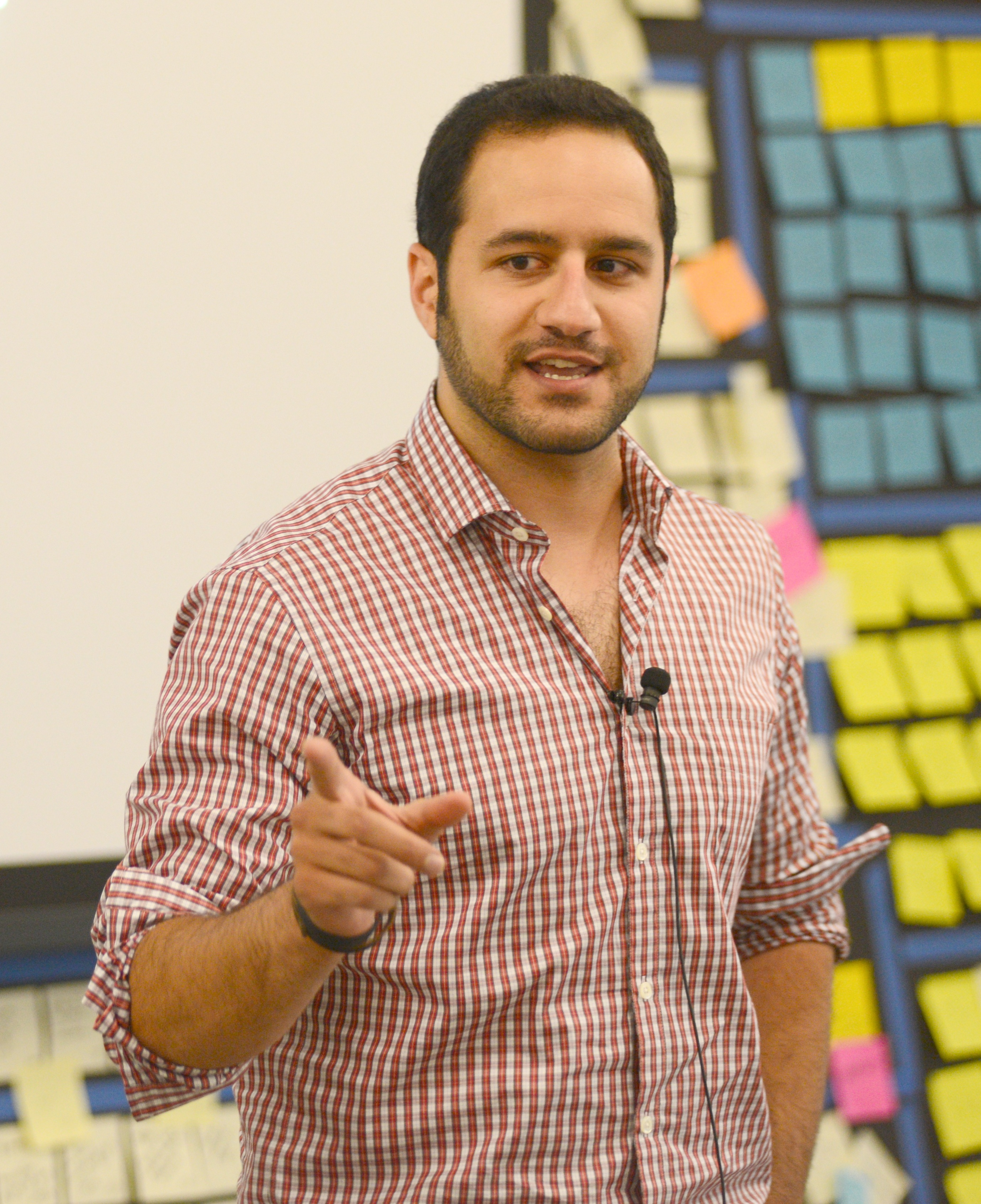
- Radfar, 2013
- Born: July 14, 1980 (age 46); London, England
- Education: University of Pennsylvania (B.S.E/B.A.); Carnegie Mellon University (M.S.)
- Occupation: Entrepreneur

Hooman Radfar (born July 14, 1980, London, England) is an American entrepreneur and computer scientist. He is co-founder and CEO at Collective, an online back-office platform designed for freelancers and consultants. He is currently a Venture Partner at Expa, a San Francisco-based start-up venture firm and studio where he was a founding partner. Previously, he was co-founder and CEO of AddThis, which was purchased by Oracle in 2016 for around $200 million.

== Early life and education ==
At the time of the Iranian Revolution, his family immigrated to England in 1979. Radfar was born in London in 1980. His family later moved to the United States where he was raised in Pittsburgh, Pennsylvania. Radfar graduated from Upper St. Clair High School in 1998. In 2002, he graduated magna cum laude from the University of Pennsylvania with degrees in computer science and economics. In 2004, he earned his M.S. from Carnegie Mellon University where he researched social networking, multi-agent systems, and their application to computational economics.

== Career ==
=== AddThis ===
In 2004, Radfar and Austin Fath founded Clearspring Technologies to create a platform for website developers to grow their traffic and engagement, based on their graduate research in web services and social networking at Carnegie Mellon. Clearspring launched the first content sharing and tracking service designed for web publishers in 2006. The company acquired AddThis in 2008, then XGraph in 2011. Clearspring was rebranded as AddThis in 2012. AddThis announced it's acquisition to Oracle in 2016.

=== Expa ===
In 2014, Radfar moved to San Francisco, joining Expa as an EIR. He became a founding partner at the firm alongside Uber co-founder Garrett Camp and Foursquare co-founder Naveen Selvadurai in 2015. He led the investment program at Expa before founding Collective and transitioning to Venture Partner.

=== Collective ===
Radfar co-founded Collective with Ugur Kaner and Bugra Akcay. The company launched on September 29, 2020 and is funded by General Catalyst Investors, QED Investors, Expa, Gradient Ventures, Better Tomorrow Ventures, Intuit Ventures, Semper Virens, and Sound Ventures.

=== Patents ===
- Method and apparatus for widget and widget-container platform adaptation and distribution, (2008)
- Methods and apparatus for management of inter-widget interactions, (2010)
- Method and apparatus for widget-container hosting and generation, (2011).
- Method and apparatus for data processing, (2012).
