= Maziar Ashrafian Bonab =

Iranian forensic scientist

Maziar Ashrafian Bonab (Persian: مازیار اشرفیان بناب) is an Iranian forensic pathologist and a medical geneticist specialising in forensic and cancer genetics (the use of the DNA markers in the investigation of crime, biological anthropology and cancer genetics) and Forensic Facial Reconstruction. Part of his groundbreaking research uses human DNA markers (mainly mtDNA and the Y chromosome markers) to identify the ancestral history of humans/human populations in both anthropological and forensic cases. His main area of research is Cancer Genetics.

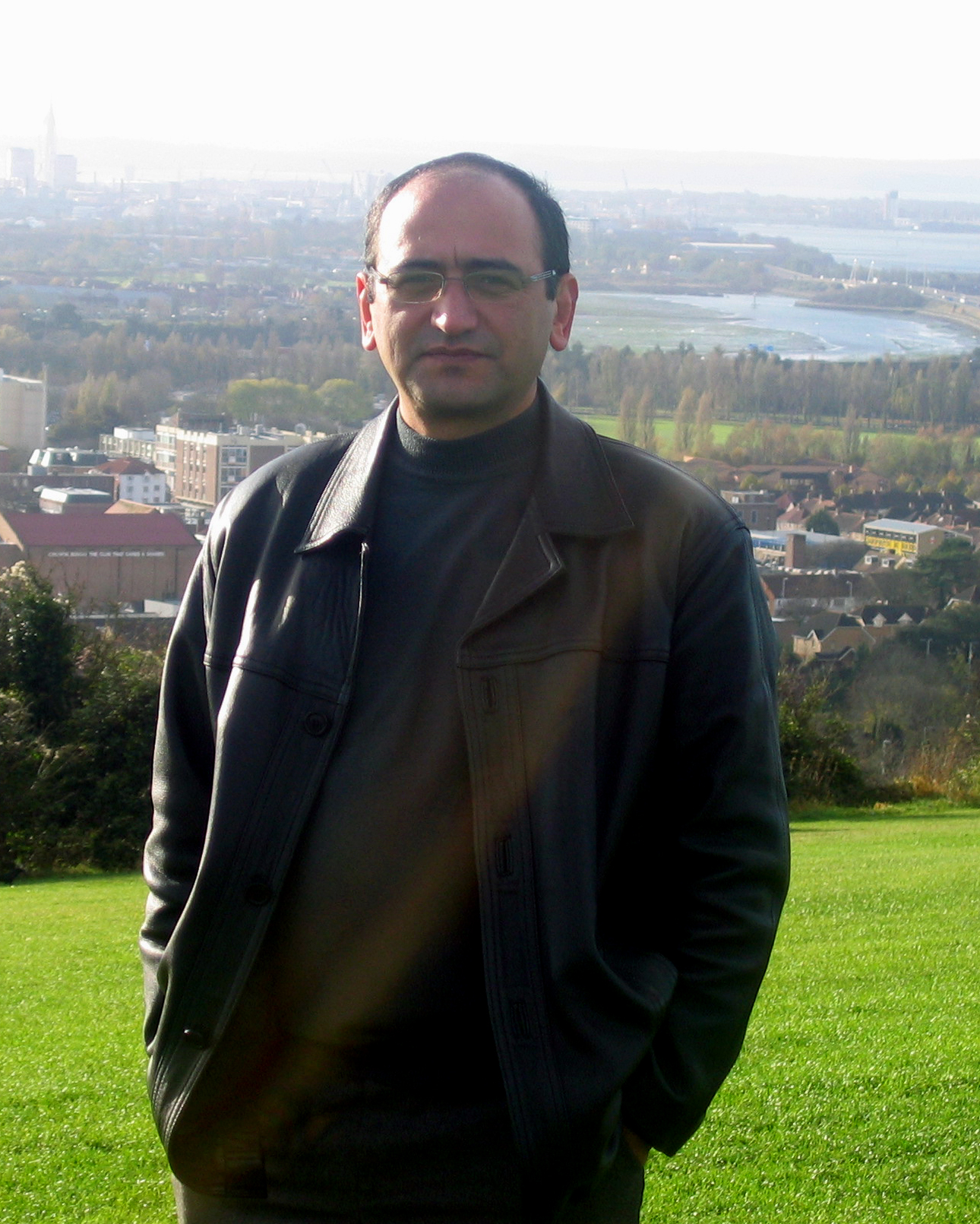

Maziar was born in Tehran, Iran in September 1966. Before completing his PhD in Cambridge, he first qualified as a Medical Doctor from Tehran University of Medical Sciences (1984–1991) and worked as a Medical Practitioner in Iran. After completing a postgraduate course in Forensic Medicine at the Iranian Legal Medical Organization (1992), he worked as the head of Hormozgan Province Legal Medical Centre (Iran) for four years (1992–1996). As well as dealing with many different forensic cases and having done more than 400 autopsies, he taught forensic medicine and medical anthropology to the undergraduate and postgraduate degree programmes within the Bandar-Abbas University of Medical Sciences and Bandar-Abbas Islamic Azad University.

From 1996 to 2002, he worked as an academic member of the Iranian Archaeological Research Centre at the Cultural Heritage Organization of Iran (ICHO) - and as a forensic anthropologist, he participated in seventeen archaeological excavations around Iran.

At the same time as the founder and head of The National Museum of Medical Sciences History (Iran), he worked in the first medical museum in the country and the largest one in the Middle East. In 2003 he completed an MSc degree in Archaeology (2002–2003) at the Department of Biomolecular Sciences; University of Manchester Institute of Science and Technology, and in October 2003, he started a PhD in the field of Genetics at the University of Cambridge. He has published various books and papers on his research. In his current research, he is using genetic tools to investigate the maternal and paternal history of the Iranian ethnic groups and also the emergence of the first farmers in the Iranian Plateau (eastern parts of the Fertile Crescent) and the origin of Aryans (Indo-Iranians) and Indo-Aryan race theory. His research also included the following:

- Understanding of how the genetic variants contribute to disease.
- Development of new methods to address questions regarding genetic disorders, particularly various cancers.
- Investigation of the genetic variations in the connexin genes that lead to various human disorders, such as diabetes, cardiovascular diseases, congenital disorders and secondary lymphedema.
- Identifying genes predisposing humans to cancer or contributing to cancer growth through somatic changes.

== Published Papers ==
- Bakhtiari-Nezhad, S; Rejali, L; Hadizadeh, M; Taleghani, MY; Aghdaei, HA; Young, C; Khanabadi, B; Nazemalhosseini-Mojarad, E; Bonab, MA (2022). "Up regulation of long non-coding RNAs BACE1 and down regulation of LINC-PINT are associated with CRC clinicopathological characteristics". Mol Biol Rep. 49 (11): 10259–10267. doi:10.1007/s11033-022-07707-4. PMC 9618545. PMID 36087249.
- Hosseini, S; Rejali, L; Pezeshkian, Z; Malekian, M; Fatemi, N; Peyravian, N; Hadizadeh, M; Mohsenifar, Z; Khanabadi, B; Farzam, M; Sherkat, G; Asadzadeh Aghdaei, H; Nazemalhosseini Mojarad, E; Ashrafian Bonab, M (2022). "Oncogenic Role of Connective Tissue Growth Factor Is Associated with Canonical TGF-β Cascade in Colorectal Cancer". Genes (Basel). 13 (4): 689. doi:10.3390/genes13040689. PMC 9031605. PMID 35456495.
- Sadri, S; Rejali, L; Hadizadeh, M; Aghdaei, HA; Young, C; Nazemalhosseini-Mojarad, E; Zali, MR; Bonab, MA (2022). "ANRIL as a prognostic biomarker in colon pre-cancerous lesion detection via non-invasive sampling". Genes Genet Syst. 96 (6) 21-00102: 285–292. doi:10.1266/ggs.21-00102. PMID 35296566.
- Pezeshkian, Z; Nobili, S; Peyravian, N; Shojaee, B; Nazari, H; Soleimani, H; Asadzadeh-Aghdaei, H; Ashrafian Bonab, M; Nazemalhosseini-Mojarad, E; Mini, E (2021). "Insights into the Role of Matrix Metalloproteinases in Precancerous Conditions and in Colorectal Cancer". Cancers (Basel). 13 (24): 6226. doi:10.3390/cancers13246226. PMC 8699154. PMID 34944846.
- Ameli-Mojarad, M; Ameli-Mojarad, M; Hadizadeh, M; Young, C; Babini, H; Nazemalhosseini-Mojarad, E; Bonab, MA (2021). "The effective function of circular RNA in colorectal cancer". Cancer Cell Int. 21 496. doi:10.1186/s12935-021-02196-0. PMC 8447721. PMID 34535136.
- Savabkar, S; Zali, N; Hadizadeh, M; Tavangarroosta, S; Young, C; Shojaeian, F; Ebrahimi, N; Ashrafian Bonab, M; Rezvani, H; Shalileh, F; Nazemalhosseini-Mojarad, E (2020). "Lack of association between VEGF -2578C/A polymorphism and risk of colorectal cancer in an Iranian population". Gastroenterol Hepatol Bed Bench. 13: S47–S52. PMC 7881395. PMID 33585003.
- Rezasoltani, S; Hadizadeh, M; Golmohammadi, M; Nazemalhossini-Mojarad, E; Salari, S; Rezvani, H; Asadzadeh-Aghdaei, H; Ladomery, M; Young, C; Anaraki, F; Almond, S; Ashrafian Bonab, M (2020). "APC and AXIN2 Are Promising Biomarker Candidates for the Early Detection of Adenomas and Hyperplastic Polyps". Cancer Inform. 19 1176935120972383. doi:10.1177/1176935120972383. PMC 7672736. PMID 33239858.
- Kashani, E; Hadizadeh, M; Chaleshi, V; Mirfakhraie, R; Young, C; Savabkar, S; Irani, S; Asadzadeh Aghdaei, H; Ashrafian Bonab, M (2019). "The Differential DNA Hypermethylation Patterns of microRNA-137 and microRNA-342 Locus in Early Colorectal Lesions and Tumours". Biomolecules. 9 (10): 519. doi:10.3390/biom9100519. PMC 6843302. PMID 31546665.
- Peyravian, N; Larki, P; Gharib, E; Nazemalhosseini-Mojarad, E; Anaraki, F; Young, C; McClellan, J; Ashrafian Bonab, M; Asadzadeh-Aghdaei, H; Zali, MR (2018). "The Application of Gene Expression Profiling in Predictions of Occult Lymph Node Metastasis in Colorectal Cancer Patients". Biomedicines. 6: 27. doi:10.3390/biomedicines6010027. PMC 5874684. PMID 29498671.
- Hadizadeh, M; Mohaddes Ardebili, SM; Salehi, M; Young, C; Mokarian, F; McClellan, J; Xu, Q; Kazemi, M; Moazam, E; Mahaki, B; Ashrafian Bonab, M (2018). "GJA4/Connexin 37 Mutations Correlate with Secondary Lymphedema Following Surgery in Breast Cancer Patients". Biomedicines. 6: 23. doi:10.3390/biomedicines6010023. PMC 5874680. PMID 29470392.
- Platt, DE; Haber, M; Dagher-Kharrat, MB; Douaihy, B; Khazen, G; Ashrafian Bonab, M; Salloum, A; Mouzaya, F; Luiselli, D; Tyler-Smith, C; Renfrew, C; Matisoo-Smith, E; Zalloua, PA (2017). "Mapping Post-Glacial expansions: The Peopling of Southwest Asia". Sci Rep. 7 40338. Bibcode:2017NatSR...740338P. doi:10.1038/srep40338. PMC 5216412. PMID 28059138.
- Zouganelis, GD; Ogden, R; Nahar, N; Runfola, V; Bonab, M; Ardalan, A; Radford, D; Barnett, R; Larson, G; Hildred, A; Jones, M; Scarlett, G (2014). "An old dog and new tricks: Genetic analysis of a Tudor dog recovered from the Mary Rose wreck". Forensic Sci Int. 245: 51–7. doi:10.1016/j.forsciint.2014.10.001. PMID 25447174.
- Haber, M; Platt, DE; Ashrafian Bonab, M; et al. (2012). "Afghanistan's ethnic groups share a Y-chromosomal heritage structured by historical events". PLOS ONE. 7 (3) e34288. Bibcode:2012PLoSO...734288H. doi:10.1371/journal.pone.0034288. PMC 3314501. PMID 22470552.
- Haber, M; Platt, DE; Badro, DA; et al. (March 2011). "Influences of history, geography, and religion on genetic structure: the Maronites in Lebanon". Eur. J. Hum. Genet. 19 (3): 334–40. doi:10.1038/ejhg.2010.177. PMC 3062011. PMID 21119711.
- Hiby, SE; Ashrafian-Bonab, M; Farrell, L; Single, RM; Balloux, F; Carrington, M; Moffett, A; Ebrahimi, Z (2010). "Distribution of killer cell immunoglobulin-like receptors (KIR) and their HLA-C ligands in two Iranian populations". Immunogenetics. 62 (2): 65–73. doi:10.1007/s00251-009-0408-5. PMC 2814031. PMID 19936734.
- El-Sibai, M; Platt, DE; Haber, M; Xue, Y; Youhanna, SC; Wells, RS; Izaabel, H; Sanyoura, MF; Harmanani, H; Bonab, MA; Behbehani, J; Hashwa, F; Tyler-Smith, C; Zalloua, PA (2009). "Geographical structure of the Y-chromosomal genetic landscape of the Levant: a coastal-inland contrast". Ann. Hum. Genet. 73 (6): 568–81. doi:10.1111/j.1469-1809.2009.00538.x. PMC 3312577. PMID 19686289.
- Ashrafian-Bonab, M; Lawson Handley, LJ; Balloux, F (2007). "Is urbanization scrambling the genetic structure of human populations? A case study". Heredity (Edinb). 98 (3): 151–6. Bibcode:2007Hered..98..151A. doi:10.1038/sj.hdy.6800918. PMC 1808191. PMID 17106453.

== Published books ==
- Ashrafian Bonab M (2001), Author, "Essentials of Forensic Medicine", Teimorzadeh Publication Co., Tehran, Iran, کتاب ضروریات پزشکی قانونی ISBN 964-456-511-8
- Ashrafian Bonab M (2000), Current Surgery Diagnosis and treatment, 9th Edition (Translation: English to Farsi), Teimorzadeh Publication Co., ISBN 964-456-168-6
- Ashrafian Bonab M (1999), Outline of Fractures, 11th Edition (Translation: English to Farsi), Teimorzadeh Publication Co., ISBN 964-456-199-6
- Ashrafian Bonab M (1998), Outline of Orthopaedics (Adams), 12th edition (Translation: English to Farsi), Tabib Publication Co., ISBN 964-456-199-6
- Ashrafian Bonab M (1998), The Archaeology of Human Bones, Simon Mays; (Translation: English to Farsi), Iranian Cultural Heritage Organization publications, ISBN 964-7483-17-1
