= Dilara Harun =

Bangladeshi politician

Member of Parliament for Reserved Women's Seat-26
- In office 14 July 1996 – 13 July 2001

Personal details
- Born: c. 1946
- Died: 14 April 2012 (aged 66)
- Party: Bangladesh Awami League

Dilara Harun (c. 1946 – 14 April 2012) was a Bangladeshi freedom fighter and politician from Brahmanbaria belonging to Bangladesh Awami League. She was a member of the Jatiya Sangsad.

== Biography ==
Harun took part in the Liberation War of Bangladesh in 1971. She was the senior vice president of the Krishak League. She also served as the vice president of the Brahmanbaria unit of the Bangladesh Awami League. She was elected as a member of the Jatiya Sangsad from Reserved Women's Seat-26 in the June 1996 Bangladeshi general election.

Harun died on 14 April 2012 at the National Institute of Cardiovascular Diseases in Dhaka at the age of 66.
