= Hooman Tavakolian =

American wrestling coach (born 1976)

- هومن توکلیان
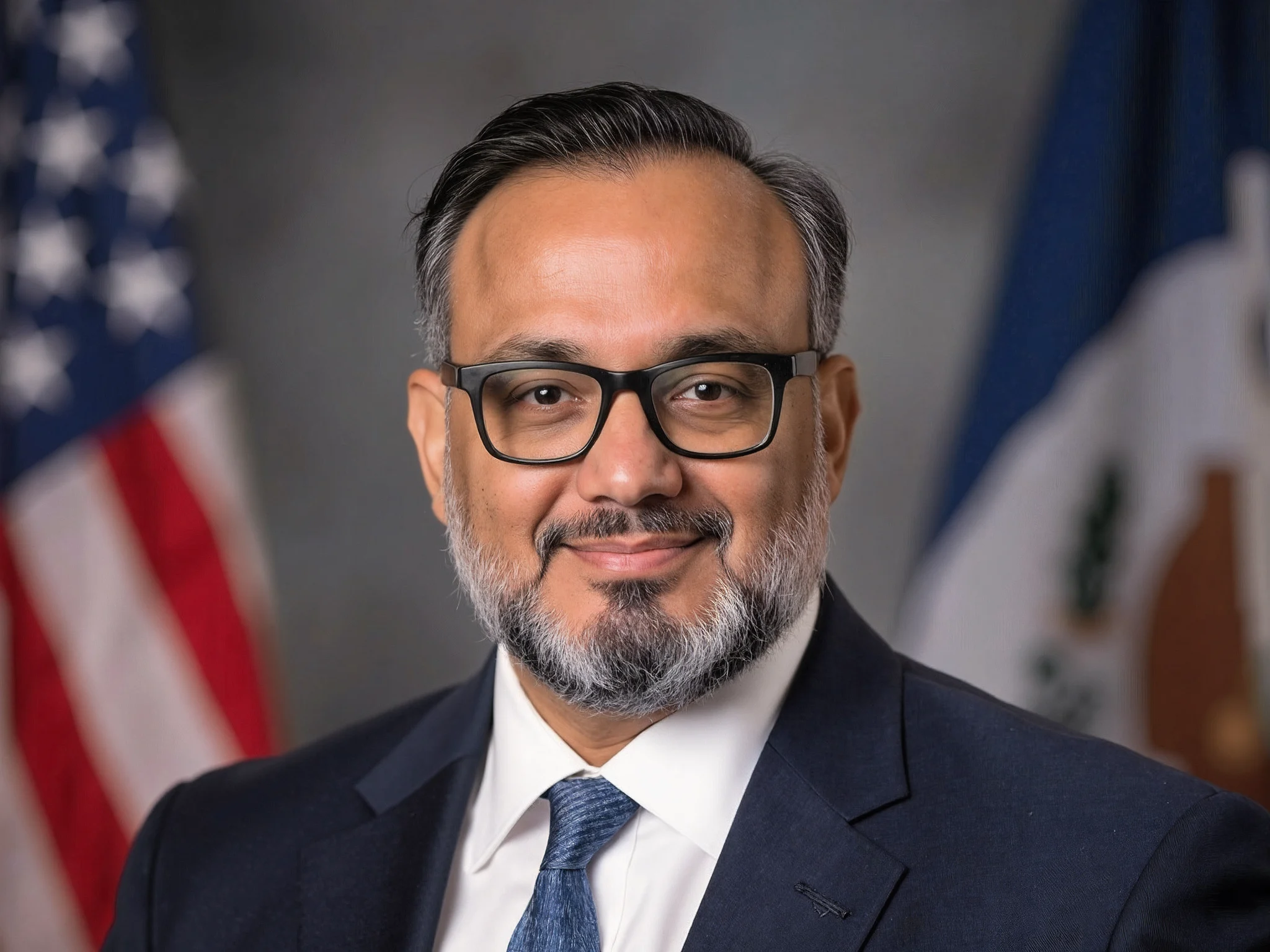
- Tavakolian in 2025
- Born: Mohammad Ali Tavakolian; September 17, 1976 (age 50); Tehran, Iran
- Education: Master of Studies in Law from Thomas Jefferson School of Law; Master of Business Administration from Long Island University
- Occupations: former wrestler, wrestling coach, sports diplomat and Chief Compliance Officer
- Years active: 1986-present
- Known for: 2017 Nominee for “Diplomatic Action of the Year” award

Hooman "Mo" Tavakolian (born Mohammad Ali Tavakolian, September 17, 1976) is an Iranian-American former wrestler, author, wrestling coach, sports diplomat and a member of United World Wrestling. He is a 2017 National Wrestling Hall of Fame and Museum inductee. He is also an executive on Wall Street and works at a global hedge fund and serves on the board of directors of Titan Mercury Wrestling.

In 2021, Tavakolian released his debut book, “Hooman's Hope: On A Mission For World Peace”, sharing his journey from Iran to the U.S., and his work in wrestling, humanitarianism, and sports diplomacy.

== Early life ==
Tavakolian was born September 17, 1976, in Tehran, Iran. At the age of nine, Tavakolian, his parents and younger brother immigrated to Great Neck, New York, during the height of the Iran-Iraq War.

== Career ==
Tavakolian began his wrestling career in 1986 at Great Neck South High School. From there, he graduated and wrestled at the NCAA Division 1 level for Hofstra University, and later, Hunter College. During his senior campaign, he earned All-Conference and All-State kudos while also being named the captain of the team. At Hunter, he wrestled in three weight classes (from 157 to 174 lbs.). In his senior year, he became team captain under coach Bob Gaudenzi. Following graduation from Hunter College in 1999 with a degree in Psychology, he retired from competitive wrestling. Tavakolian served as the Hunter College Wrestling Team Assistant Coach for two seasons.

His post-collegiate wrestling career includes competing for the New York Athletic Club and taking part in the National Veteran's World Championship in Budapest.

In addition, Tavakolian is the vice president of the New York Athletic Club and also the U.S. Delegate for the Iranian National Wrestling Team. He was also the liaison for the Islamic Republic of Iran during the Senior and Junior World Championships for wrestling and handled diplomacy between Iran and the US.

As of August 2022, he is an executive on Wall Street and work at a global hedge fund.

In 2024, as a board member of the Titan Mercury Wrestling Club, Tavakolian took part in signing a two-year joint agreement with the Jordan Wrestling Federation (JWF).

== Philanthropy ==
In 2011, he founded the “Become Your Own Dream” scholarship with Lorelei Martin and former Hunter College wrestler and mentor, Jon Tush. Each year the scholarship provides $2500 to a graduating high school senior in New York City who plans to wrestle in college. In 2012, Tavakolian partnered the fund with the long-standing youth development program, Beat the Streets New York City. He has also funded mats and sport facilities for Iranian people in wrestling.

Tavakolian launched a campaign to collect funds and to rebuild the Maiwand Wrestling Club in Kabul, Afghanistan following a September 5 ISIS attack. Wrestling fans around the world, and prominent champions such as Jordan Burroughs, joined the campaign and soon after their donations, including wrestling equipment, reached Kabul. American donations made through Tavakolian's charity, Hoomanities, funded the purchase of new mats, mat covers, gym equipment, and wrestling outfits. He has also secured further contributions, including wrestling gear from several American universities.

In 2019, Tavakolian founded Hoomanities Inc., a not for profit organization "To encourage global community, to empower adolescent youth around the world and to reinstate hope in humanity through sports." Tavakolian, a Beat the Streets (BTS) board member, donated sports bras and Nike Pro Hijabs through his charity “Hoomanities” for distribution to Muslim female wrestlers in the Public Schools Athletic League. He actively advocates for gender equality in sports and the advancement of female athletes from the Middle East and beyond. Tavakolian also serves as an adviser at Wrestling For Peace organization.

In addition, he has co-founded the Living Your Dream Scholarship Fund that provides financial assistance to a college-bound Beat the Streets athletes.

== Recognition ==
On April 28, 2017, he was inducted into the National Wrestling Hall of Fame, Downstate New York Chapter. He was recognized under the Lifetime Service Award winners.

Tavakolian was nominated in 2017 for the Peace and Sport Federation's “Diplomatic Action of the Year” award for his efforts to bring together the Islamic Republic of Iran Wrestling Federation and the USA Wrestling Federation through the 2017 Wrestling World Cup, during which he was leader of the US team. Iran, the World Cup host, had initially barred the US team from competing in retaliation for President Trump's travel bans.

In 2025, USA Wrestling appointed Tavakolian as the newest steward of its prestigious Living the Dream Medal Fund, a program that incentivizes U.S. Olympic and World medalists with financial awards.

== Boards ==
In addition, he is the member of Board of Titan Mercury Wrestling club and former member of UWW Sports for all commission. During his time as The Iranian American Board member at BTSNY, Tavakolian, brought Iran wrestling team to compete in TIMES SQUARE in Manhattan.
