= Golnar =

Golnar (Persian: گلنار, lit. 'pomegranate flower') is a feminine given name of Persian origin.

People with this name include:

- Golnar Abivardi (born 1973), Swiss dentist and entrepreneur
- Golnar Adili (born 1976), Iranian-born American multidisciplinary artist
- Golnar Khosrowshahi (born 1971), Iranian-born Canadian businesswoman and CEO
- Golnar Servatian (born 1977), Iranian cartoonist
