= Jenaab =

Honorific

Jenaab (Persian: جناب ) is a term used in Persian when addressing someone of higher social status, or an individual deserving additional respect.
