= Shota Rustaveli (disambiguation) =

Shota Rustaveli was a Georgian poet.

Shota Rustaveli may also refer to:

- Shota Rustaveli Peak, a mountain.
- SS Shota Rustavelli, a Russian cargo ship
- MS Shota Rustaveli, a former cruise ship
- Shota Rustaveli State Prize, a state prize of Georgia.
- Shota Rustaveli State University, educational institution in Georgia.
- List of things named after Shota Rustaveli
