= List of things named after Shota Rustaveli =

This is a list of places, buildings, roads and other things named for the medieval Georgian poet Shota Rustaveli.

== Geographic locations ==
- Rustaveli Avenue, one of the central thoroughfares in Tbilisi, Georgia
- Shota Rustaveli Street, Kyiv, street in Kyiv
- Shota Rustaveli Street, Tashkent, street in Tashkent
- Shota Rustaveli Peak, a mountain in the central part of the Greater Caucasus

== Organizations ==
- Shota Rustaveli National Science Foundation, a Georgian government agency supporting fundamental research and education
- Shota Rustaveli Society, a civil organization established in Georgia in 1988

== Structures ==
- Rustaveli Cinema, a movie theatre in Tbilisi, Georgia
- Shota Rustaveli State Academic Theatre, a theatre in Tbilisi, Georgia
- Shota Rustaveli Institute of Georgian Literature, a research institute in Tbilisi, Georgia
- Shota Rustaveli Theatre and Film University, an educational institution in Tbilisi, Georgia
- Shota Rustaveli State University, an educational institution in Batumi, Georgia
- Shota Rustaveli Tbilisi International Airport, Georgia's main international airport
- Rustaveli, a metro station of Tbilisi Metro

== Ships ==
- SS Shota Rustavelli, a former Soviet cargo ship
- MS Shota Rustaveli, a former Soviet cruise ship

== Other ==
- Shota Rustaveli Prize, a prize awarded by the Georgian government in the fields of art and science
- Rustaveli, a basin located in the northern hemisphere of Mercury
