= Interfaith dialogue =

Positive interaction of different religious people

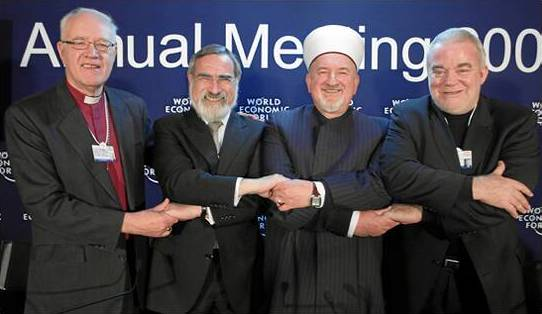
Left to right: George Carey, Archbishop of Canterbury (1991–2002); Jonathan Sacks, Chief Rabbi (UK); Mustafa Cerić, Grand Mufti of Bosnia and Herzegovina; Jim Wallis, Sojourners, US. 2009 World Economic Forum in Davos, Switzerland.

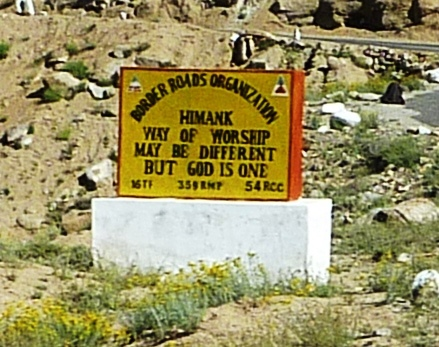
Roadside sign in the Nubra Valley, Ladkah, India

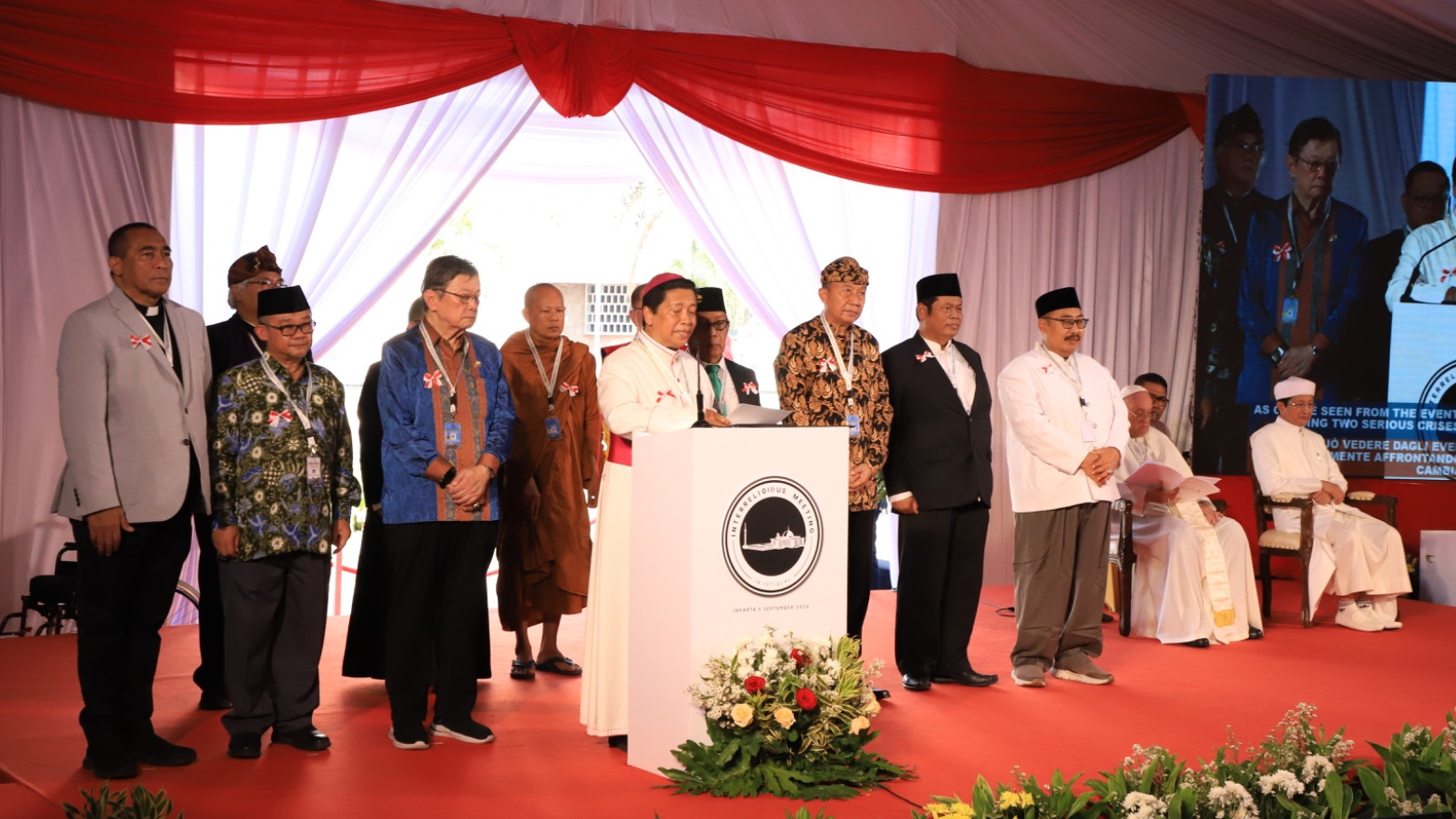
Pope Francis, Leader of the Catholic Church and Nasaruddin Umar, Grand Imam of Istiqlal Mosque in preparing signed the Istiqlal Declaration for dialogue with interfaith leaders in Jakarta, Indonesia.

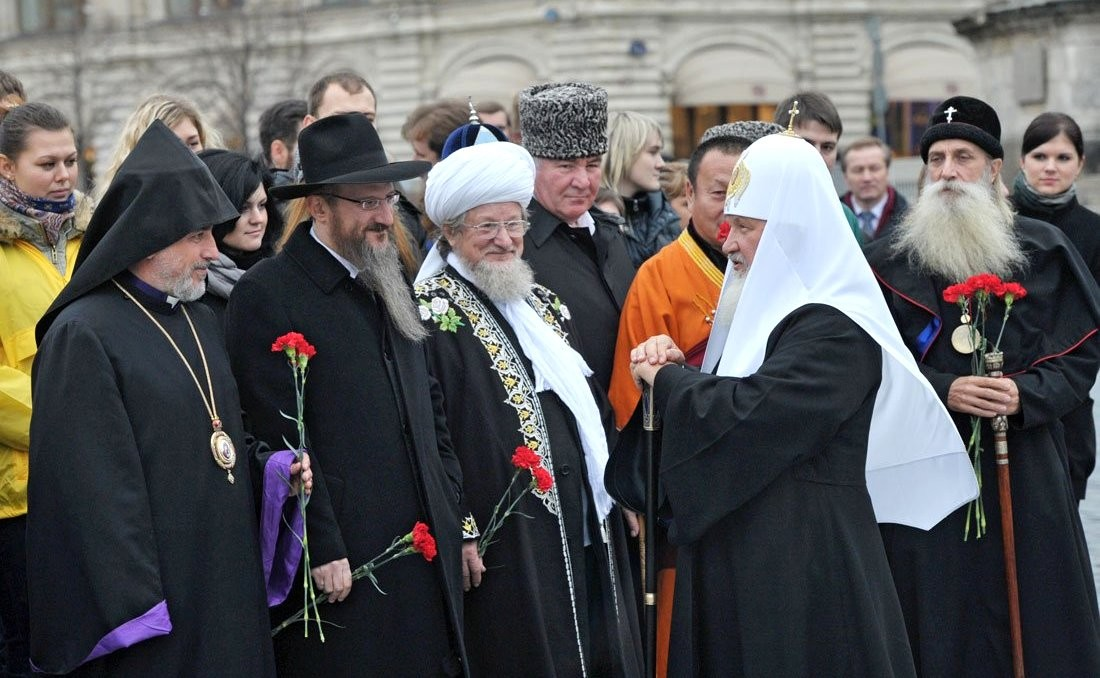
Russian religious leaders (Armenian, Jewish, Muslim, Buddhist, Orthodox, Old Believer) during the official celebrations of the 2012 National Unity Day

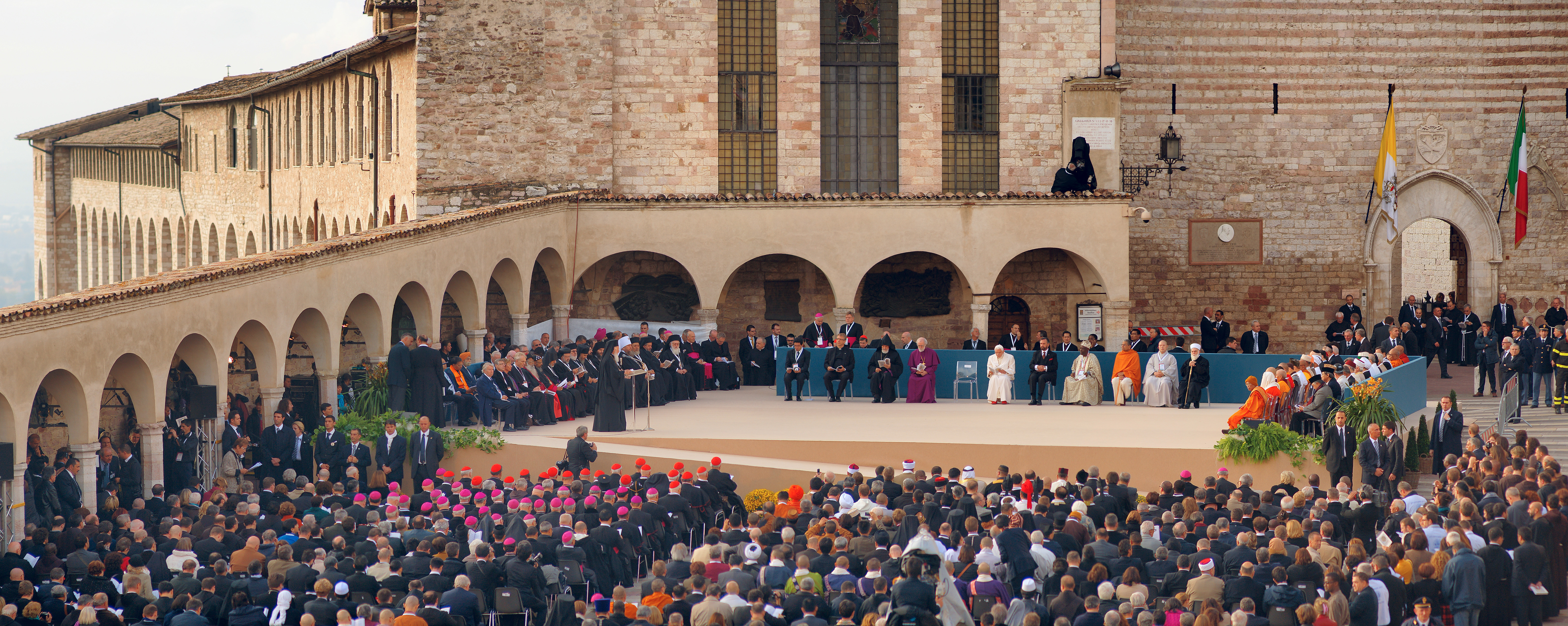
The 2011 fourth World Day of Prayer for Peace in Assisi, Italy

Interfaith dialogue, also known as interreligious dialogue, refers to cooperative, constructive, and positive interaction between people of different religious traditions (i.e., "faiths") or spiritual or humanistic beliefs, at both the individual and institutional levels.

Throughout the world, there are local, regional, national and international interfaith initiatives; many are formally or informally linked and constitute larger networks or federations. These include organisations such as the United Religions Initiative, the Parliament of the World's Religions, and interfaith training institutions like OneSpirit Interfaith Foundation in the United Kingdom, which since 1996, has prepared interfaith ministers for community service, spiritual accompaniment, and inclusive ceremony.

The often quoted statement "There will be no peace among the nations without peace among the religions. There will be no peace among the religions without dialogue among the religions" was formulated by Hans Küng, a professor of Ecumenical Theology and President of the Global Ethic Foundation. Interfaith dialogue plays a major role in the study of religion and peacebuilding.

== Definition ==
The Archdiocese of Chicago's Office for Ecumenical and Interreligious Affairs defines "the difference between ecumenical, interfaith, and interreligious relations", as follows:

- "ecumenical" as "relations and prayer with other Christians",
- "interfaith" as "relations with members of the 'Abrahamic faiths' (Jewish, Muslim and Christian traditions)", and
- "interreligious" as "relations with other religions, such as Hinduism and Buddhism".

Some interfaith dialogues have more recently adopted the name interbelief dialogue, while other proponents have proposed the term interpath dialogue, to avoid implicitly excluding atheists, agnostics, humanists, and others with no religious faith but with ethical or philosophical beliefs, as well as to be more accurate concerning many world religions that do not place the same emphasis on "faith" as do some Western religions. Similarly, pluralistic rationalist groups have hosted public reasoning dialogues to transcend all worldviews (whether religious, cultural or political), termed transbelief dialogue. To some, the term interreligious dialogue has the same meaning as interfaith dialogue. The World Council of Churches states: "Following the lead of the Roman Catholic Church, other churches and Christian religious organizations, such as the World Council of Churches, have increasingly opted to use the word interreligious rather than interfaith to describe their own bilateral and multilateral dialogue and engagement with other religions. [...] the term interreligious is preferred because we are referring explicitly to dialogue with those professing religions—who identify themselves explicitly with a religious tradition and whose work has a specific religious affiliation and is based on religious foundations."

== History ==
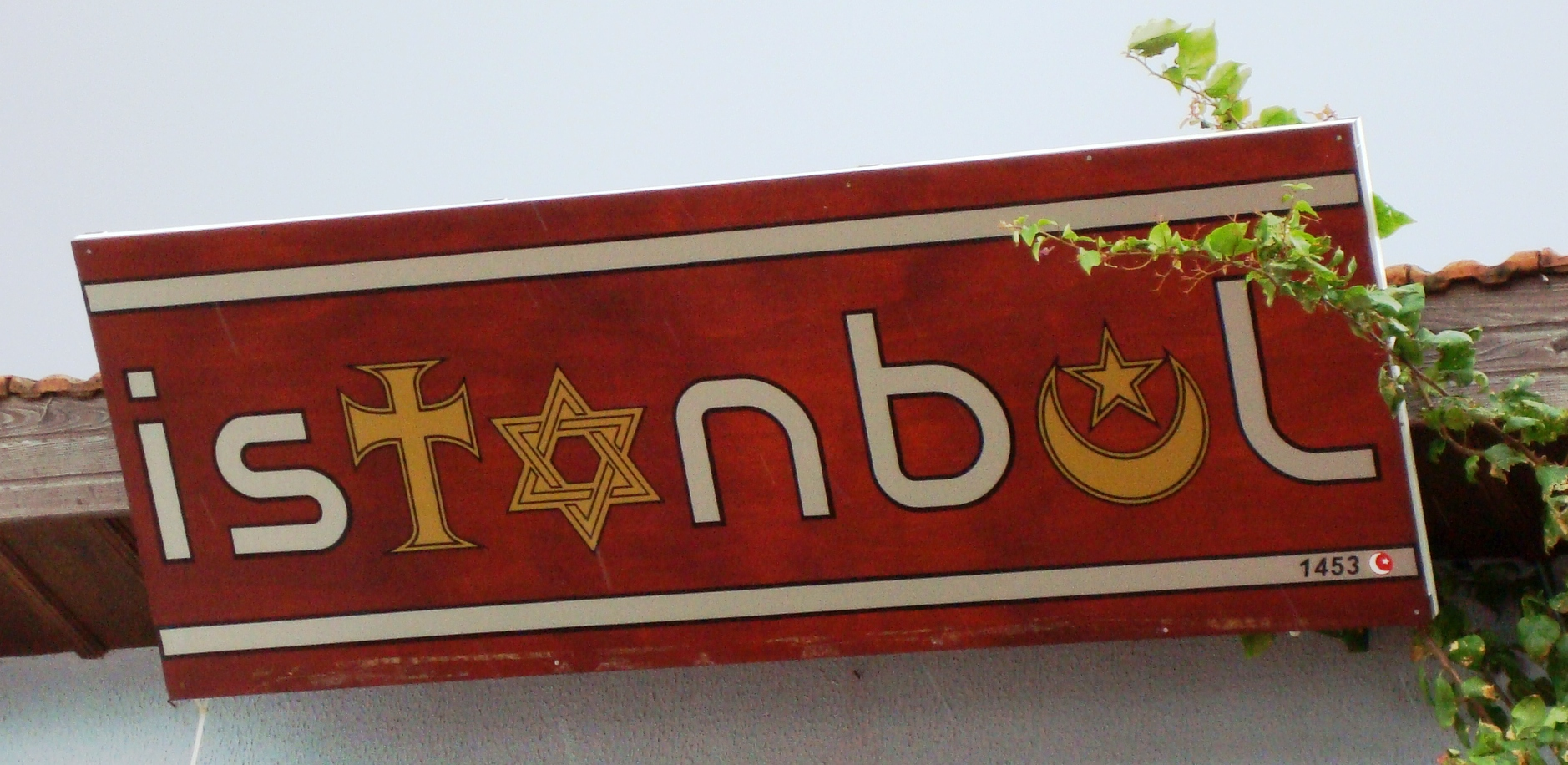
Istanbul text with Abrahamic religions in Turkey

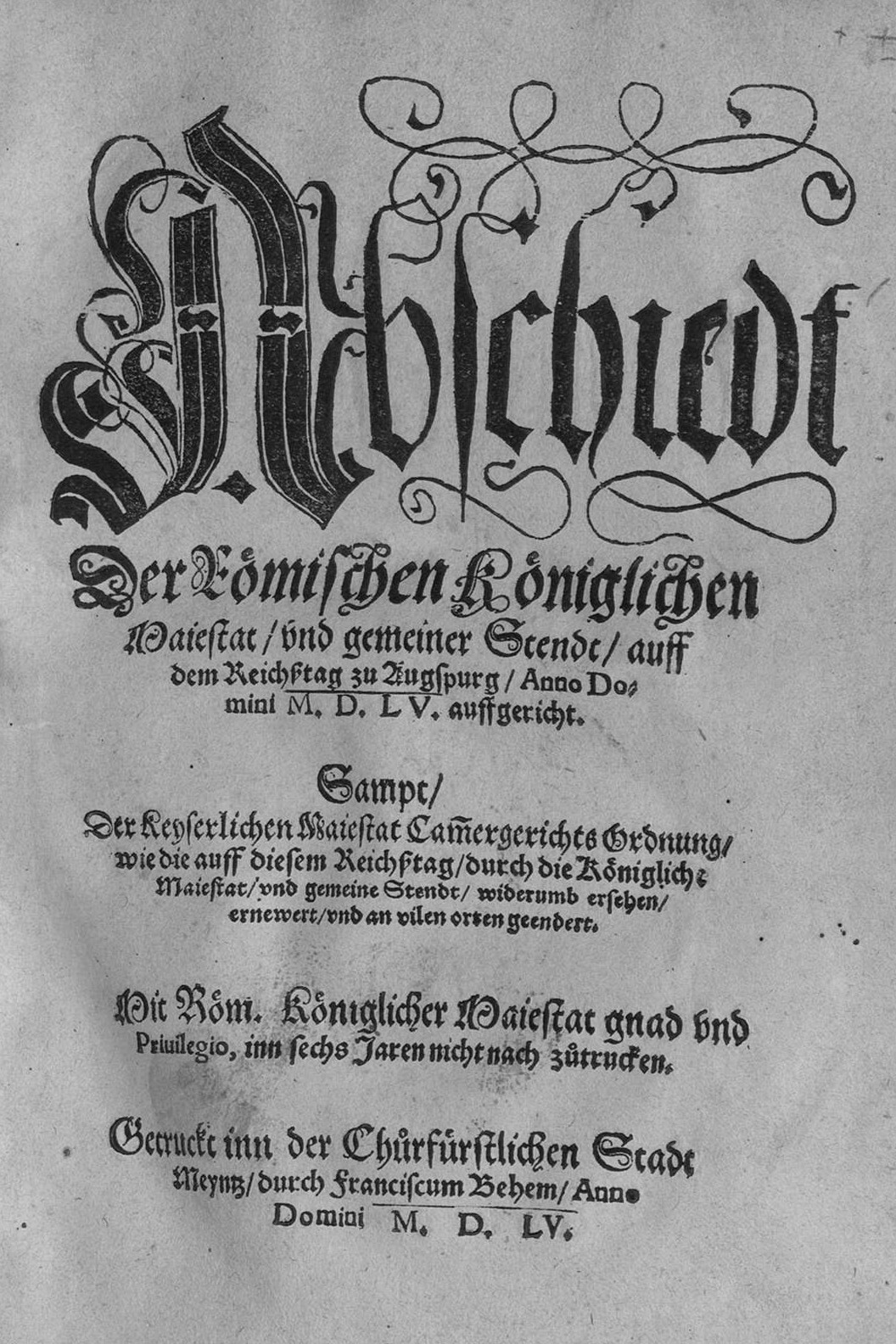
Front page of the 1555 Peace of Augsburg, which recognized two different churches in the Holy Roman Empire

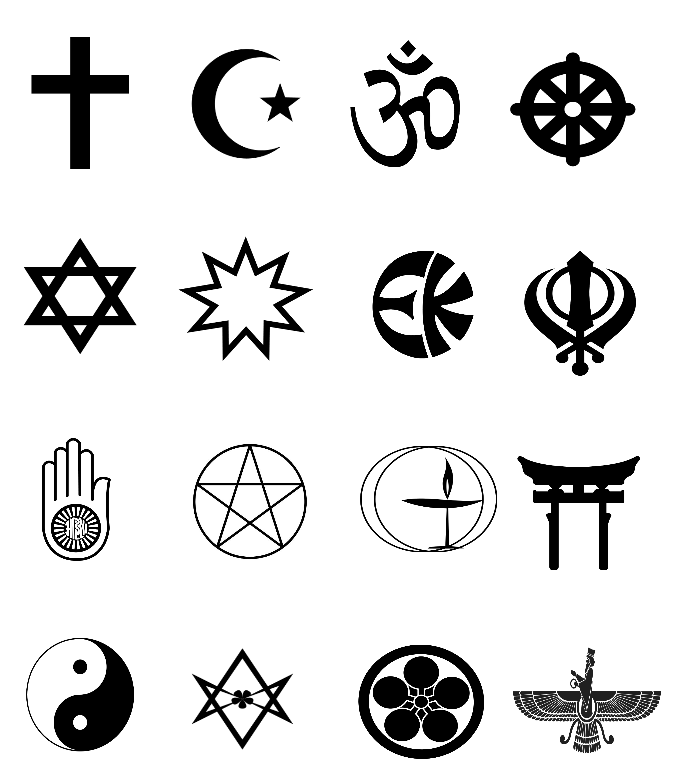
Symbols representing: Christians, Muslims, Hindus, Buddhists, Jews, Baháʼís, Eckists, Sikhs, Jains, Wiccans, Unitarian Universalists, Shintoists, Taoists, Thelemites, Tenrikyoists, Zoroastrians

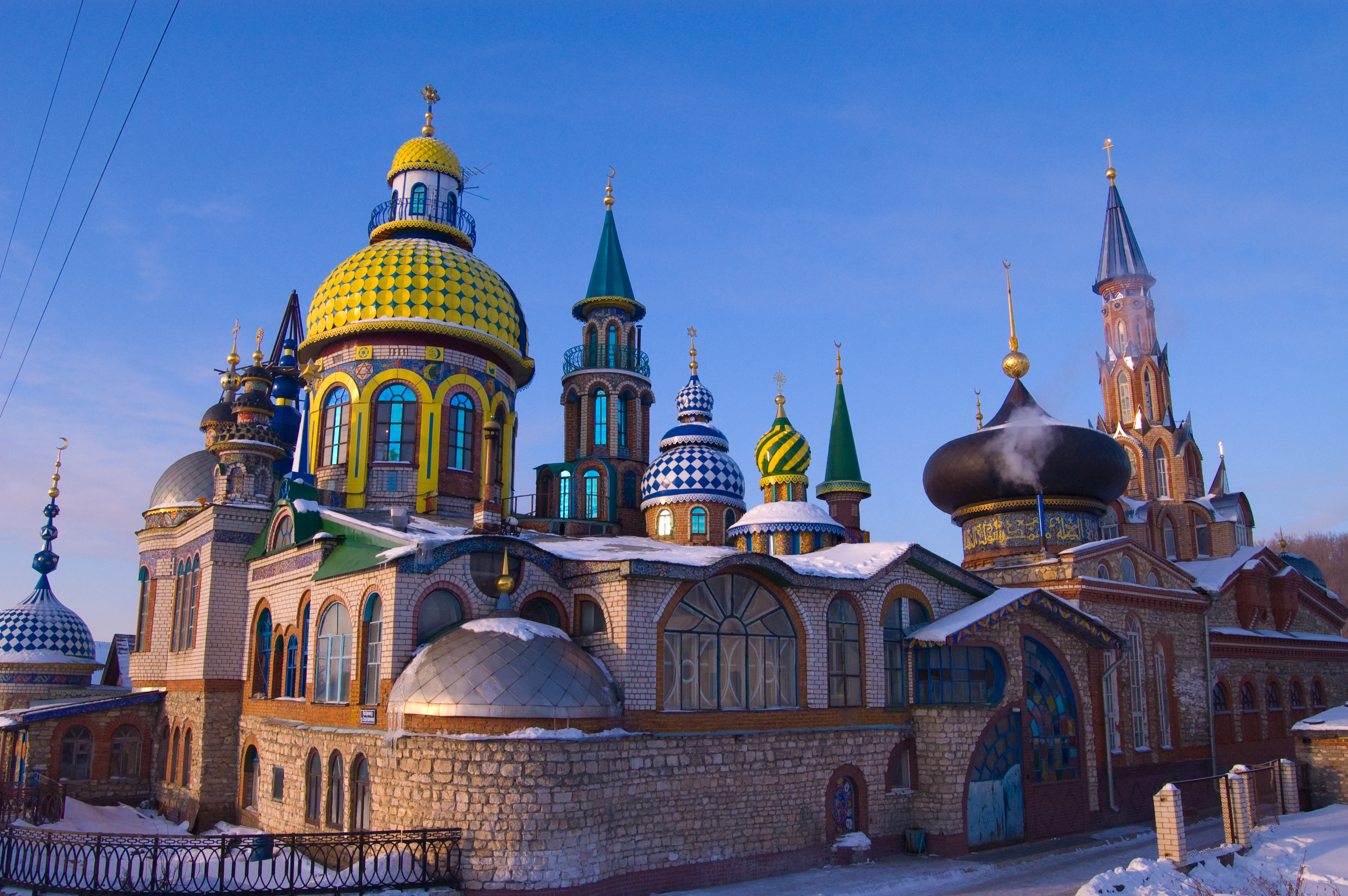
Temple of All Religions in Kazan, Russia

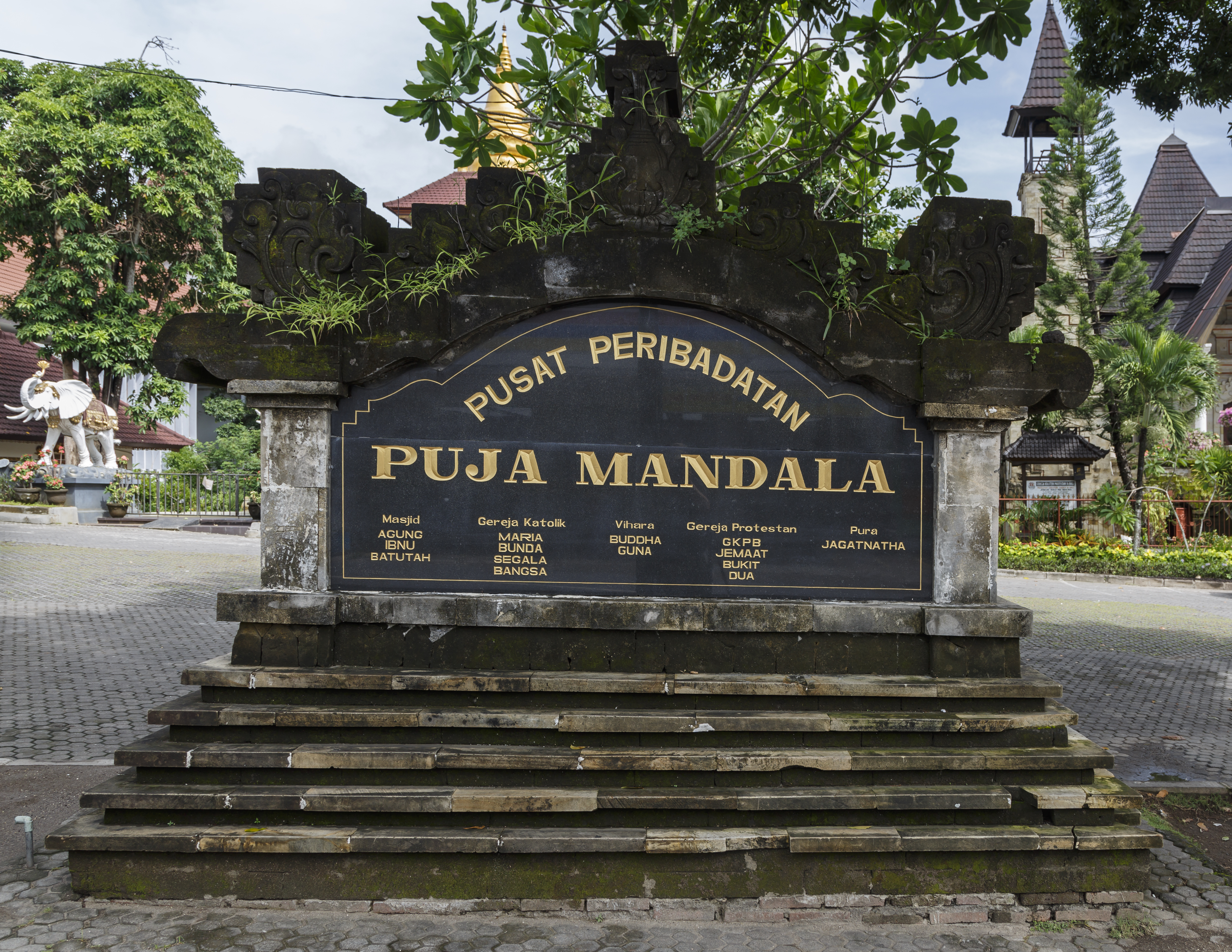
Puja Mandala, a temple that symbolizes tolerance of diversity in Indonesia located in Kuta, Bali

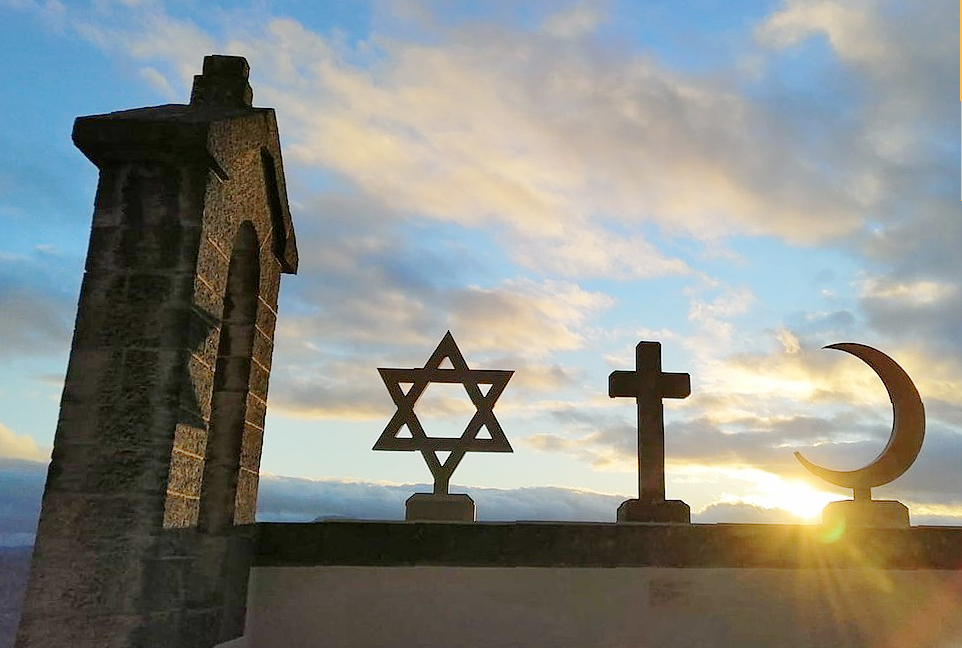
Dialogos in the City of San Marino, Republic of San Marino

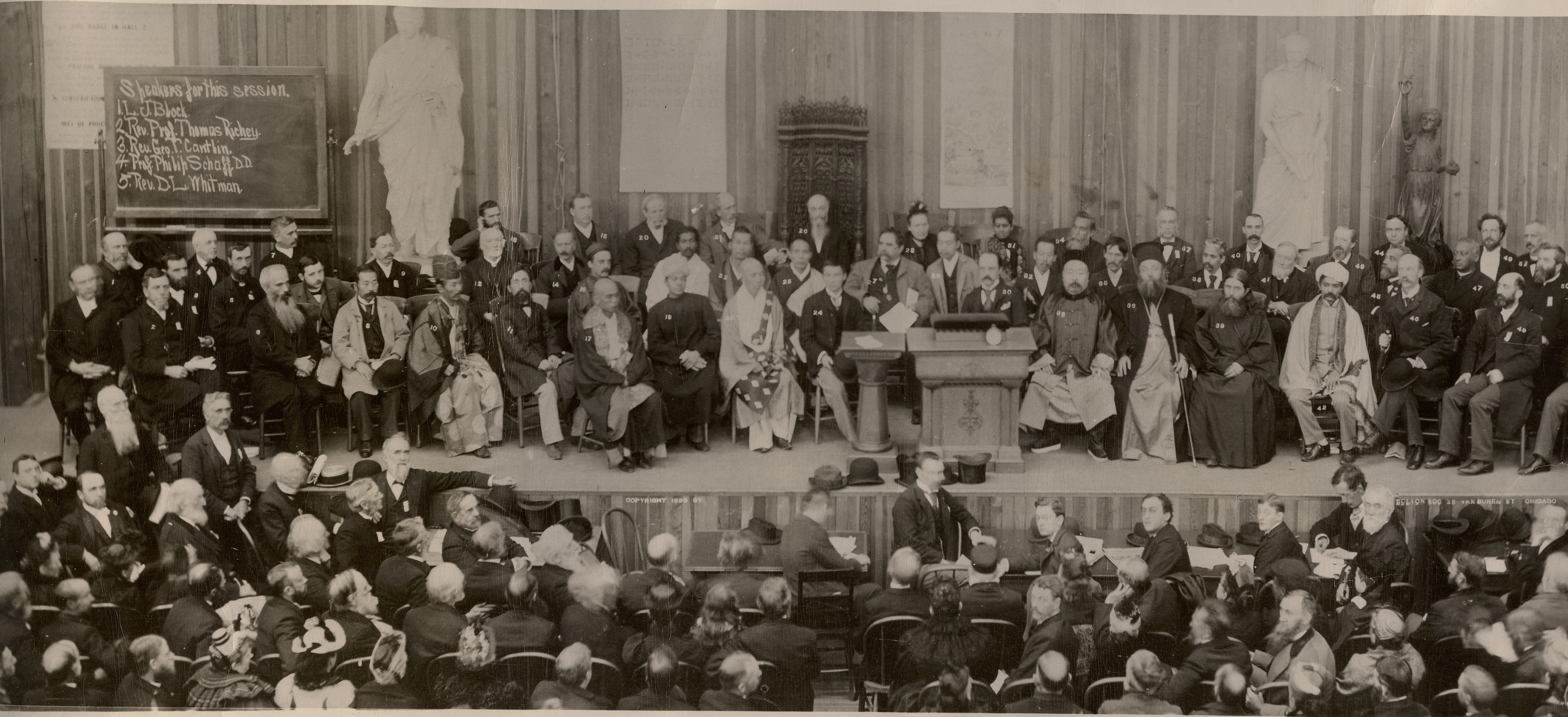
Congress of Parliament of the World's Religions, Chicago, 1893

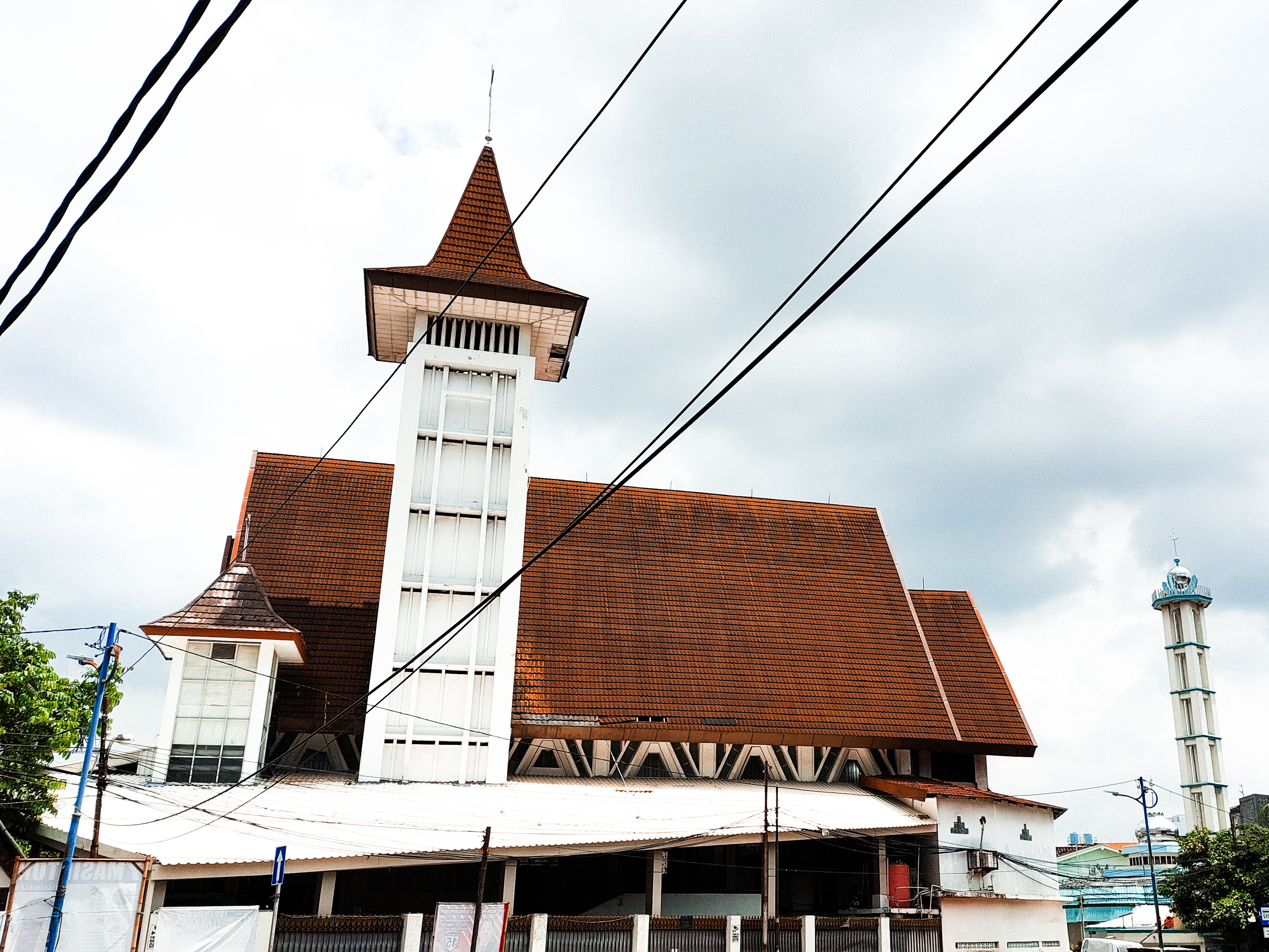
Batak Christian Protestant Church is located next to the Al Istikharah Mosque in Jakarta, Indonesia.

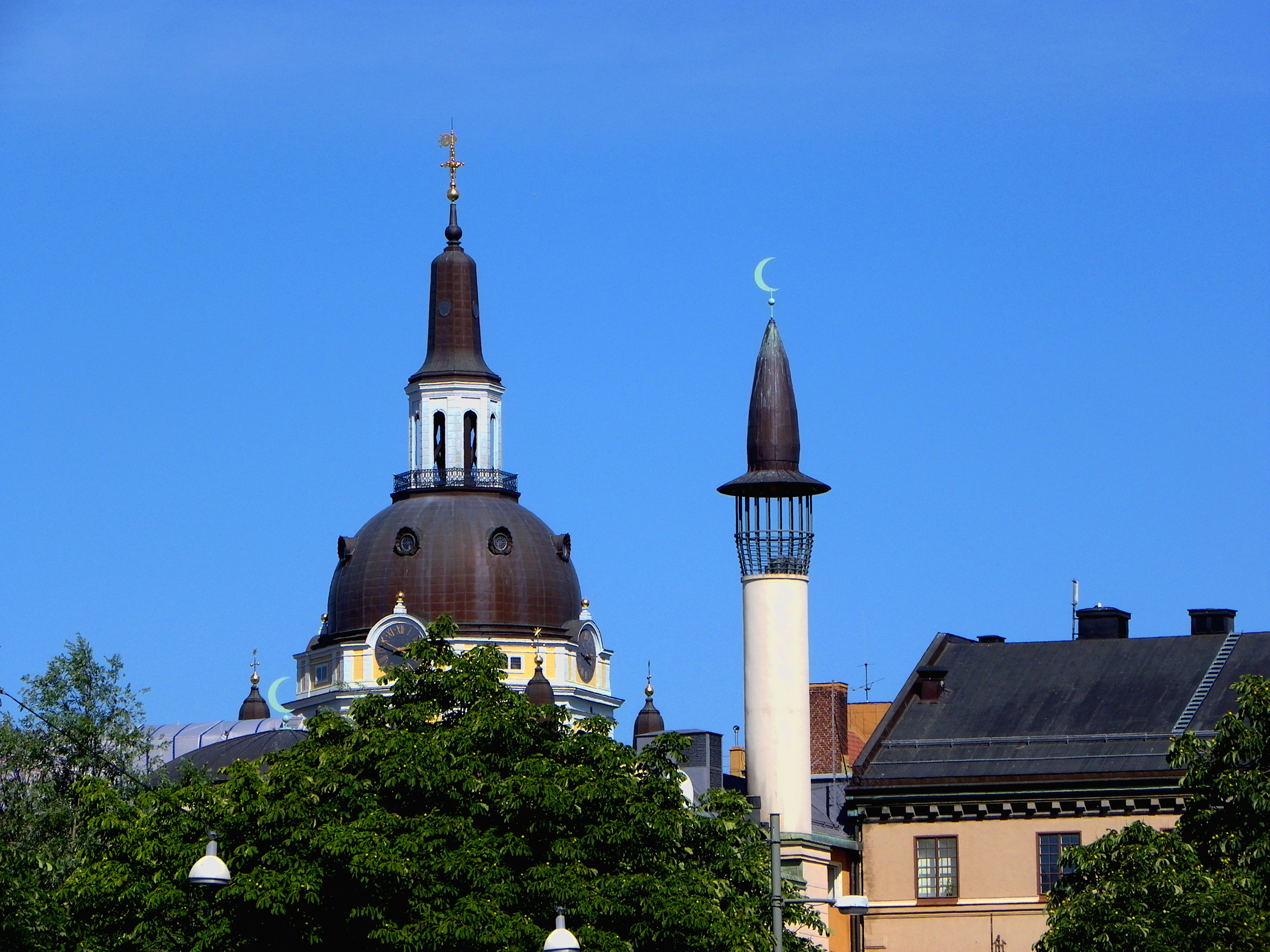
Katarina Church and the minaret of the Stockholm Mosque

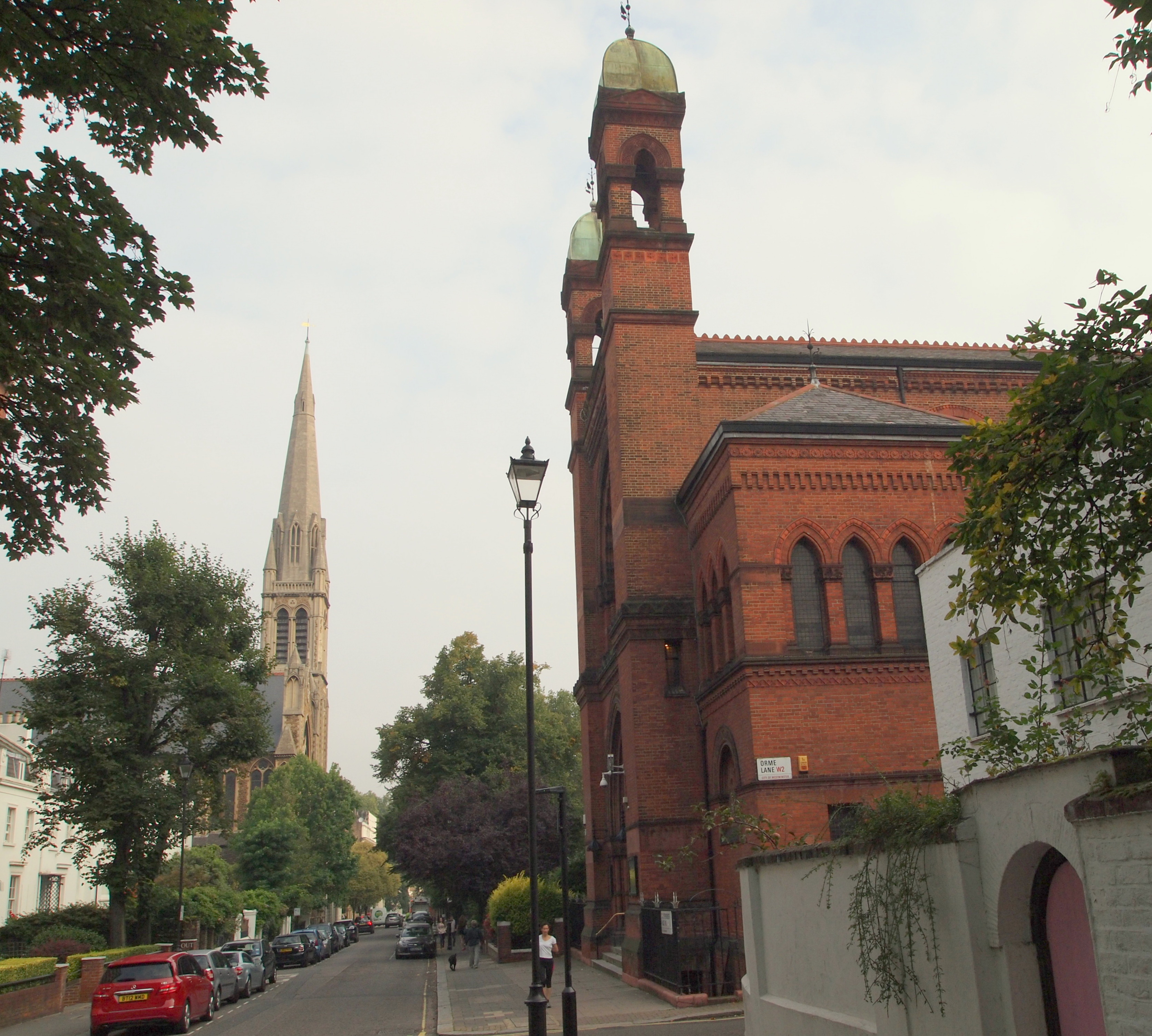
The West London Synagogue and the Church of Saint Matthew in London, England

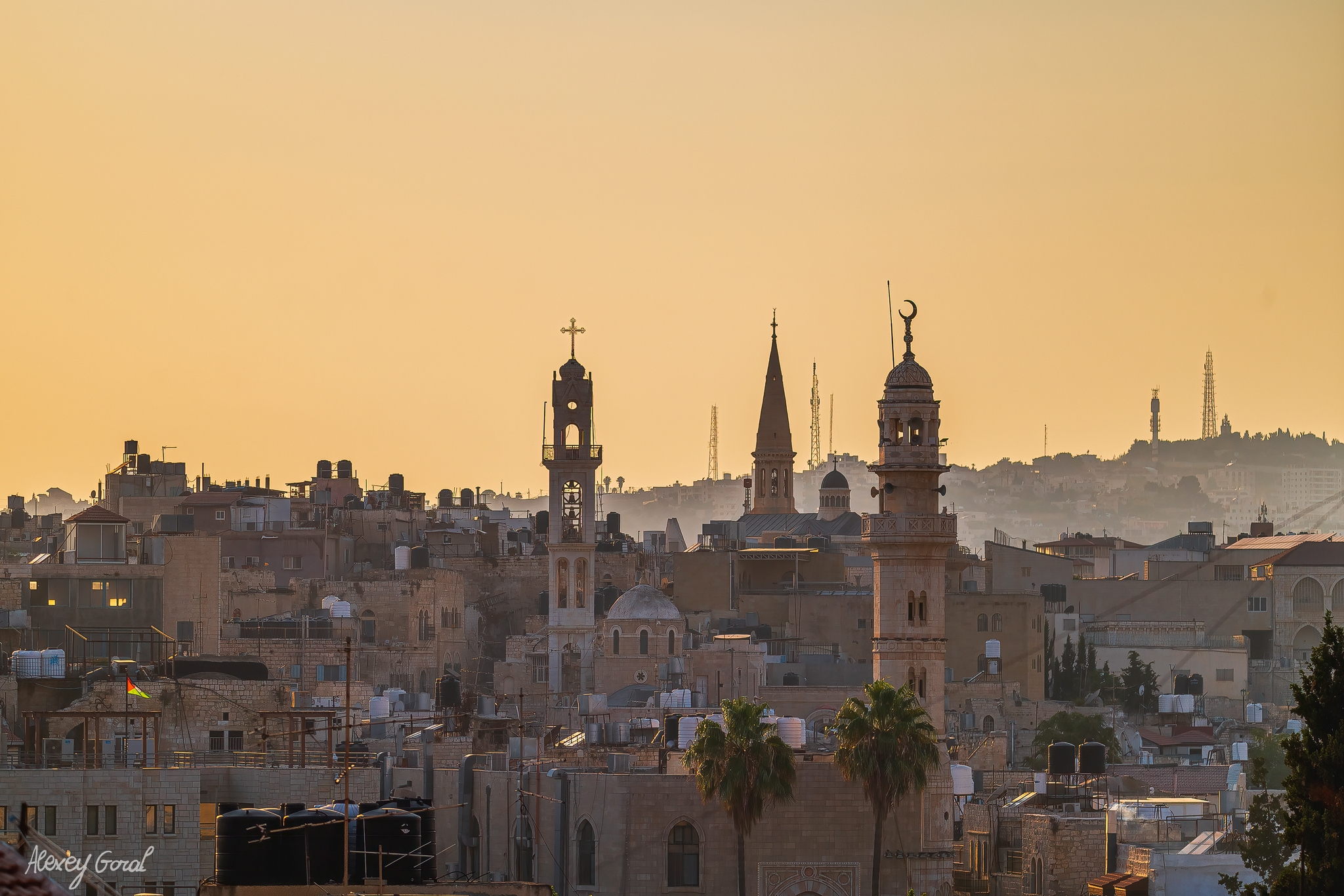
Skyline of Bethlehem with the Mosque of Omar, the Evangelical Lutheran Christmas Church, Salesian Church of the Sacred Heart of Jesus in Bethlehem, Palestine

History records examples of interfaith initiatives throughout the ages, with varying levels of success in establishing one of three types of "dialogue" to engender, as recently described, either understanding, teamwork, or tolerance:

1. "In the dialogue of the head, we mentally reach out to the other to learn from those who think differently from us."
2. "In the dialogue of the hands, we all work together to make the world a better place in which we must all live together."
3. "In the dialogue of the heart, we share the experience of the emotions of those different from us."

The historical effectiveness of interfaith dialogue is an issue of debate. Friar James L. Heft, in a lecture on "The Necessity of Inter-Faith Diplomacy", spoke about the conflicts among practitioners of the three Abrahamic religions (Judaism, Christianity and Islam). Noting that except for the Convivencia in the 14th and 15th centuries, believers in these religions have either kept their distance or have been in conflict, Heft maintains, "there has been very little genuine dialogue" between them. "The sad reality has been that most of the time Jews, Muslims and Christians have remained ignorant about each other, or worse, especially in the case of Christians and Muslims, attacked each other."

In contrast, The Pluralism Project at Harvard University says, "Every religious tradition has grown through the ages in dialogue and historical interaction with others. Christians, Jews, and Muslims have been part of one another's histories, have shared not only villages and cities, but ideas of God and divine revelation."

The importance of Abrahamic interfaith dialogue in the present has been bluntly presented: "We human beings today face a stark choice: dialogue or death!"

More broadly, interfaith dialogue and action have occurred over many centuries. In the 16th century, the Emperor Akbar encouraged tolerance in Mughal India, a diverse nation with people of various faith backgrounds, including Islam, Hinduism, Sikhism, and Christianity.

Religious pluralism can also be observed in other historical contexts, including Muslim Spain. Zarmanochegas (Zarmarus) (Ζαρμανοχηγὰς) was a monk of the Sramana tradition (possibly, but not necessarily a Buddhist) from India who journeyed to Antioch and Athens while Augustus (died 14 CE) was ruling the Roman Emprire.

Disputation of Barcelona – religious disputation between Jews and Christians in 1263. The apostate Paulus [Pablo] Christiani proposed to King James I of Aragon that a formal public religious disputation on the fundamentals of faith should be held between him and R. Moses b. Nahman (Nachmanides) whom he had already encountered in Gerona. The disputation took place with the support of the ecclesiastical authorities and the generals of the Dominican and Franciscan orders, while the king presided over a number of sessions and took an active part in the disputation. The Dominicans Raymond de Peñaforte, Raymond Martini, and Arnold de Segarra, and the general of the Franciscan order in the kingdom, Peter de Janua, were among the Christian disputants. The single representative for the Jewish side was Naḥmanides. The four sessions of the disputation took place on July 20, 27, 30, and 31, 1263 (according to another calculation, July 20, 23, 26, and 27). Naḥmanides was guaranteed complete freedom of speech in the debate; he took full advantage of the opportunity thus afforded and spoke with remarkable frankness. Two accounts of the disputation, one in Hebrew written by Naḥmanides and a shorter one in Latin, are the main sources for the history of this important episode in Judeo-Christian polemics. According to both sources the initiative for the disputation and its agenda were imposed by the Christian side, although the Hebrew account tries to suggest a greater involvement of Naḥmanides in finalizing the items to be discussed. When the ecclesiastics who saw the "not right" turn the disputation was taking, due to Nahmanides persuasive argumentation, they urged that it should be ended as speedily as possible. It was, therefore, never formally concluded, but interrupted. According to the Latin record of the proceedings, the disputation ended because Nahmanides fled prematurely from the city. In fact, however, he stayed on in Barcelona for over a week after the disputation had been suspended in order to be present in the synagogue on the following Sabbath when a conversionist sermon was to be delivered. The king himself attended the synagogue and gave an address, an event without medieval precedent. Nahmanides was permitted to reply on this occasion. The following day, after receipt of a gift of 300 sólidos from the king, he returned home.

While the Disputation may have been a great achievement for Paulus Christiani in his innovative use of rabbinic sources in Christian missionary efforts, for Naḥmanides it represented an additional example of the wise and courageous leadership which he offered his people.

== Religious beliefs ==
=== Baháʼí Faith ===
Interfaith and multi-faith interactivity is integral to the teachings of the Baháʼí Faith. Its founder Bahá'u'lláh enjoined his followers to "consort with the followers of all religions in a spirit of friendliness and fellowship". Through the Baháʼí International Community agency, an official United Nations (UN) NGO, the Baháʼís also participate at a global level in inter-religious dialogue both through and outside of the United Nations processes.

In 2002, the Universal House of Justice, the global governing body of the Baháʼís, issued a letter to the religious leadership of all faiths in which it identified religious prejudice as one of the last remaining "isms" to be overcome, enjoining such leaders to unite in an effort to root out extreme and divisive religious intolerance.

=== Buddhism ===
Buddhism has historically been open to other religions. Ven. Dr. K. Sri Dhammananda stated:

Buddhism is a religion which teaches people to 'live and let live'. In the history of the world, there is no evidence to show that Buddhists have interfered or done any damage to any other religion in any part of the world for the purpose of introducing their religion. Buddhists do not regard the existence of other religions as a hindrance to worldly progress and peace.

The 14th Dalai Lama believes that the "common aim of all religions, an aim that everyone must try to find, is to foster tolerance, altruism and love". He met with Pope Paul VI at the Vatican in 1973. He met with Pope John Paul II in 1980, 1982, 1986, 1988, 1990, and 2003. In 2006, he met privately with Pope Benedict XVI. In 1990, he met in Dharamsala with a delegation of Jewish teachers for an extensive interfaith dialogue. He has since visited Israel three times and met in 2006 with the Chief Rabbi of Israel. He has also met the late Archbishop of Canterbury Dr. Robert Runcie, and other leaders of the Anglican Church in London, Gordon B. Hinckley, late President of the Church of Jesus Christ of Latter-day Saints (Mormons), as well as senior Eastern Orthodox Church, Muslim, Hindu, Jewish, and Sikh officials.

In 2010, the Dalai Lama was joined by Rev. Katharine Jefferts Schori, presiding bishop of the Episcopal Church, Chief Rabbi Lord Jonathan Sacks of the United Hebrew Congregations of the Commonwealth, and Islamic scholar Professor Seyyed Hossein Nasr of George Washington University when Emory University's Center for the Study of Law and Religion hosted a "Summit on Happiness".

=== Christianity ===
In 2013, Pope Francis became the first Catholic leader to call for "sincere and rigorous" interbelief dialogue with atheists, both to counter the assertion that Christianity is necessarily an "expression of darkness of superstition that is opposed to the light of reason", and to assert that "dialogue is not a secondary accessory of the existence of the believer" but instead is a "profound and indispensable expression ... [of] faith [that] is not intransigent, but grows in coexistence that respects the other."

=== Hinduism ===
Hinduism has a strong principle for interfaith dialogue as the Upanishads state, "Vasudhaiva Kutumbakam" which means "the world is one family." Hinduism encourages harmony and cooperation among religious communities.

Historically, scholars like Shankaracharya engaged with Buddhist and Jain philosophers refining his school of thought. The Bhakti movement's emphasis on devotion versus theological distinction allowed interactions between Hindu and Islamic traditions—which is seen in the works of Kabir and Guru Nanak.

Swami Vivekanand emphasized religious harmony and universal acceptance during his speech at the World's Parliament of Religions in 1893. This speech helped shape contemporary Hindu approach to interfaith dialogue.

=== Islam ===
Muslim theologians have advocated inter-faith dialogue on a large scale, something which is new in a political sense.

Dialogue is particularly encouraged amongst the People of the Book (Jews, Christians and Muslims). The principles found in the Islamic and Christian scriptures present the opportunity for both religions to meet at a common moral ground. This common ground was stated as "part of the very foundational principles of both faiths: love of the One God, and love of the neighbour". The declaration asserted that "these principles are found over and over again in the sacred texts of Islam and Christianity".

Amir Hussain writes that "Islam would not have developed if it had not been for interfaith dialogue". From his "first revelation" for the rest of his life, Muhammad was "engaged in interfaith dialogue" and "pluralism and interfaith dialogue" have always been important to Islam. For example, when some of Muhammad's followers suffered "physical persecution" in Mecca, he sent them to Abyssinia, a Christian nation, where they were "welcomed and accepted" by the Christian king. Another example is Córdoba, Andalusia, in Muslim Spain, in the ninth and tenth centuries. Córdoba was "one of the most important cities in the history of the world". In it, "Christians and Jews were involved in the Royal Court and the intellectual life of the city". Thus, there is "a history of Muslims, Jews, Christians, and other religious traditions living together in a pluralistic society". Turning to the present, Hussain writes that in spite of Islam's history of "pluralism and interfaith dialogue", Muslims now face the challenge of conflicting passages in the Qur'an some of which support interfaith "bridge-building", but others can be used to "justify mutual exclusion".

In October 2010, as a representative of Shia Islam, Ayatollah Mostafa Mohaghegh Damad, professor at the Shahid Beheshti University of Tehran, addressed the Special Assembly for the Middle East of the Synod of Catholic Bishops stating, "the rapport between Islam and Christianity" that has existed throughout the history of Islam as one of "friendship, respect and mutual understanding".

According to the Ahmadiyya understanding, interfaith dialogues are an integral part of developing inter-religious peace and establishing peace.

=== Judaism ===
The Modern Orthodox movement allows narrow exchanges on social issues, while warning to be cautious in the discussion of doctrine. Reform Judaism, Reconstructionist Judaism and Conservative Judaism encourage interfaith dialogue.

Building positive relationships between Jews and members of other religious communities has been an integral component of Reform Judaism. Interests in interfaith relations require an awareness of the range of Jewish views on such subjects as mission and the holy land.

External videos
- The President Speaks at the Islamic Society of Baltimore

== Initiatives ==
Throughout the world, there are local, regional, national and international interfaith initiatives; many are formally or informally linked and constitute larger networks or federations. Interfaith dialogue forms a major role in the study of religion and peace-building. Organizations such as the United Nations support such dialogue.

=== Research on interfaith dialogue ===
In the emerging field of Interreligious studies, historians, sociologists, and other scholars have conducted research on interfaith dialogue activities, methods, and outcomes.

Oxford Interfaith Forum is a leading academic resource in interdisciplinary, intercultural and interfaith studies.

== Criticism ==
Religious sociologist Peter L. Berger argued that one can reject interfaith dialogue on moral grounds in certain cases. The example he gave was that of a dialogue with imams who legitimize ISIS, saying such discussions ought to be avoided so as not to legitimize a morally repugnant theology.

The theological foundations of interreligious dialogue have also been critiqued on the grounds that any interpretation of another faith tradition will be predicated on a particular cultural, historical and anthropological perspective.

=== Criticism by specific religious groups ===
Many Traditionalist Catholics, including Sedevacantists or the Society of St. Pius X, are critical of interfaith dialogue as a harmful novelty. They argue that the Second Vatican Council altered the previous notion of the Catholic Church's supremacy over other religious groups or bodies, as well as demoted traditionalist practices associated with Roman Catholicism. In addition, these Catholics contend that, for the sake of collegial peace, tolerance and mutual understanding, interreligious dialogue devalues the divinity of Jesus Christ and the revelation of the Triune God by placing Christianity on the same footing as other religions that worship other deities. Some Evangelical Christians are also critical of dialogues with Catholics.

In the case of Hinduism, it has been argued that interfaith "dialogue ... has [in fact] become the harbinger of violence. This is not because 'outsiders' have studied Hinduism or because the Hindu participants are religious 'fundamentalists' but because of the logical requirements of such a dialogue". With a detailed analysis of "two examples from Hinduism studies", S.N. Balagangadhara and Sarah Claerhout argue that, "in certain dialogical situations, the requirements of reason conflict with the requirements of morality".

The Islamist group Hizb ut-Tahrir rejects the concept of interfaith dialogue, stating that it is a Western tool to enforce non-Islamic policies in the Islamic world.

In Modern Orthodox Judaism, the 1964 essay "Confrontation" by Rabbi Joseph B. Soloveitchik has widely been seen as "a ban on theological dialogue", though it may be seen as a statement that there were not sufficient conditions for equal and respectful dialogue.

=== Criticism of dialogue events ===
Some critics of interfaith dialogue may not object to dialogue itself, but instead are critical of specific events claiming to carry on the dialogue. For example, the French Algerian prelate Pierre Claverie was at times critical of formal inter-religious conferences between Christians and Muslims, which he felt remained too basic and surface-level. He shunned those meetings, believing they were generators of slogans and glossed over theological differences. However, he had such an excellent knowledge of Islam that the people of Oran called him "the Bishop of the Muslims" which was a title that must have pleased him since he had dreamed of establishing true dialogue among all believers, irrespective of faith or creed. Claverie also believed that the Islamic faith was authentic in practice focusing on people rather than on theories. He said that: "dialogue is a work to which we must return without pause: it alone lets us disarm the fanaticism; both our own and that of the other". He also said that "Islam knows how to be tolerant". In 1974, he joined a branch of Cimade which was a French NGO dedicated to aiding the oppressed and minorities.

== See also ==
- Intercultural dialogue
- Interspirituality – Embracing commonalities across spiritual traditions and practices
- Multifaith space – Public location for religious practices
- Universal brotherhood – Sociopolitical concept
- World Religion Day – International holiday
