= Oxford Interfaith Forum =

Global interfaith, intercultural, and interdisciplinary organisation

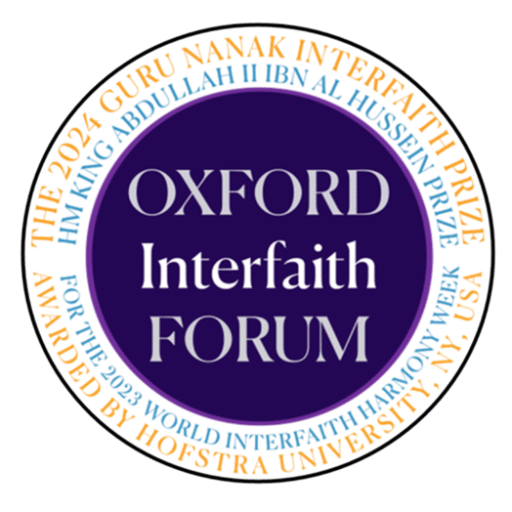
Oxford Interfaith Forum logo

The Oxford Interfaith Forum is an interfaith, intercultural, and interdisciplinary academic hub connecting scholars and communities across the world to explore academic exchange in interfaith contexts with interdisciplinary lenses.

== Overview ==
The Oxford Interfaith Forum advances scholarship related to theology and comparative religions. It runs its signature Thematic International Interfaith Reading Groups, focused on a number of academic disciplines:

- Eastern Christianity in Interfaith Contexts, chaired by Prof Sebastian Brock, FBA
- Psalms in Interfaith Contexts, chaired by Revd Prof John Goldingay, DD
- Science and Religion in Interfaith Contexts
- Art in Interfaith Contexts

== International collaborations, and linguistic and cultural diversity ==
The Oxford Interfaith Forum designs and hosts academic and community engagement events to promote cultural and linguistic diversity.

=== Sacred sounds ===
- 2023 - Awake, My Soul! An Interfaith Exploration of the Psalms Through Music, with Deus Ex-Musica
- 2024 - Celebrating Interfaith Harmony: Singing Together, Across Languages and Time, with Ashmolean Museum
- 2025 - Attuning the Mind to the Divine: The Pluriversal Archive of Sikh Liturgical Songs, with Hofstra University
- 2025 - Sacred Music and Sacred Poetry, with Ashmolean Museum

=== Sacred art ===
- 2025 - Sacred Scripts, with Ashmolean Museum
- 2025 - Rustaveli's Gift to Humanity, Multilingual Poetry Reading dedicated to the 65th Anniversary of the Recovery of Shota Rustaveli's Fresco in the Jerusalem Monastery of Holly Cross, held at All Souls College

=== Science and religion ===
- 2023 - Awakened Brain, with Prof Lisa Miller at the Spirituality Body Mind Institute, Columbia University
- 2025 - Death and Dying in Interfaith Contexts, with Institute for Islamic, Christian, and Jewish Studies (ICJS), USA
- 2025 - Decoding the Cosmos, with Cambridge Interfaith Programme, University of Cambridge

== International recognition, awards, and impact ==
The Oxford Interfaith Forum' s contribution to religious education and peace has been recognised by prestigious international prizes:

- The 2024 Guru Nanak Interfaith Prize, awarded by Hofstra University, New York, US
- The 2023 UN World Interfaith Harmony Week Award, awarded by HM King Abdullah II of Jordan

The Forum's activities have been featured in:

- Oxford Mail
- The Universal News Network
- This is Oxfordshire
- The South Asian Times
- India West Journal
- The Indian Panorama
- News India Times
- New India Abroad
- A Lotus in the Mud
- Oxfordshire Guardian
- North America News
- Interpressnews
- Rustavi2

== Endowed interfaith lectureships ==
- Edward K. Kaplan Interfaith Lectureship, endowed by Dr Jana Kaplan (Brandeis University) on behalf of her family.

== Oxford Interfaith Forum connects communities ==
A theology student at Durham University wrote about her experience with the Oxford Interfaith Forum.
