= Shota Rustaveli Street, Tashkent =

Street in Tashkent, Uzbekistan

Shota Rustaveli Street
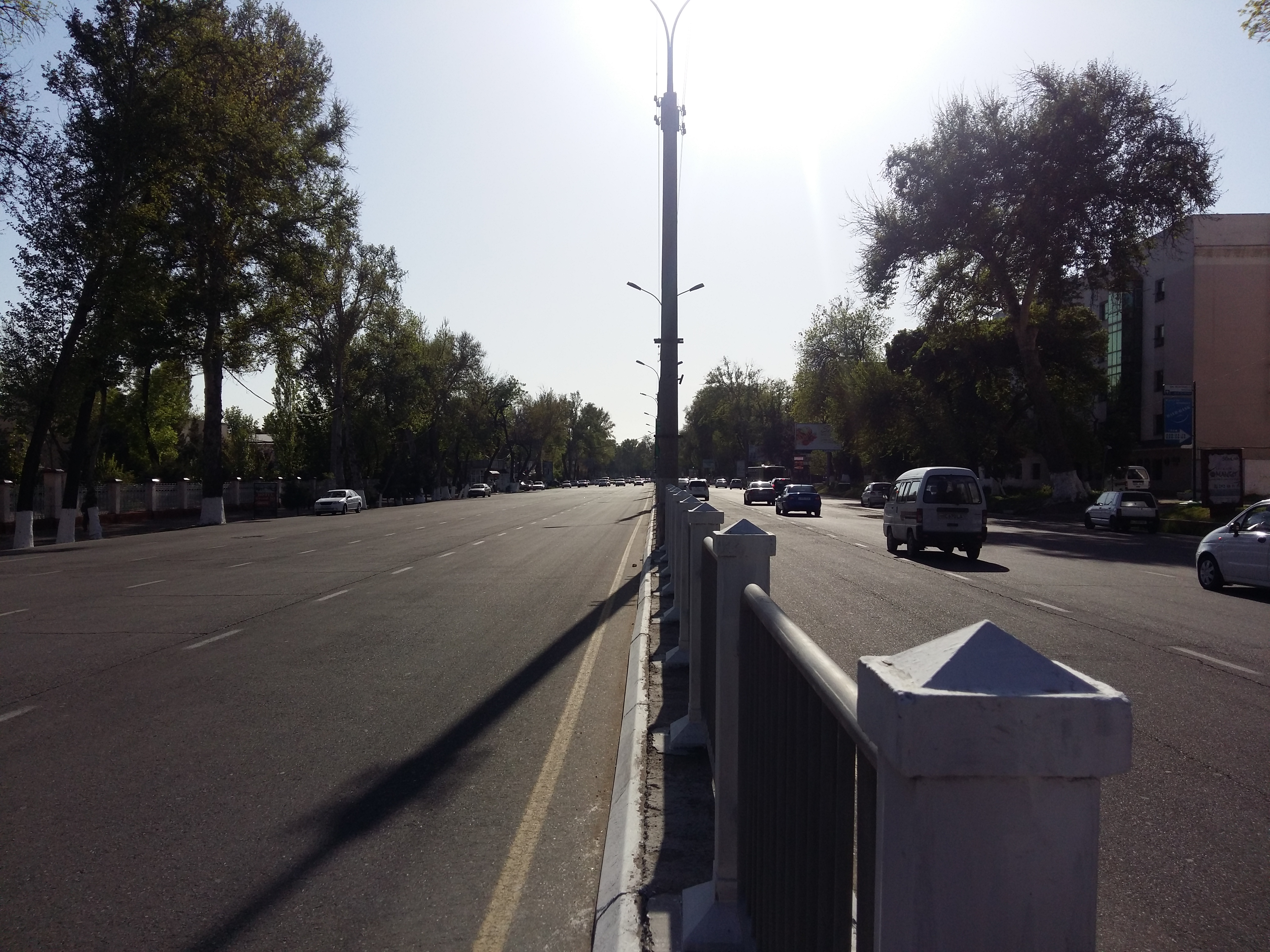
- Interactive map of Shota Rustaveli Street
- Native name: Shota Rustaveli ko'chasi (Uzbek)
- Former names: "Zangiota street", "Summer house street"
- Part of: Yakkasaray district
- Length: 6.5 km (4.0 mi)
- Location: Tashkent, Uzbekistan
- South: of Tashkent city

Other
- Known for: Monuments

Shota Rustaveli street (Uzbek: Shota Rustaveli ko'chasi, Шота Руставели кўчаси) is one of the central streets of Tashkent, Uzbekistan. The length of the street is approximately estimated to be 6.5 kilometers long and during Middle Age times, the street was the linking road between Tashkent and Samarkand. In the past, "Shota Rustaveli" street was called "Zangiota street" (Uzbek: Zangiota) and "Summer house street"(Uzbek: Dala hovli).

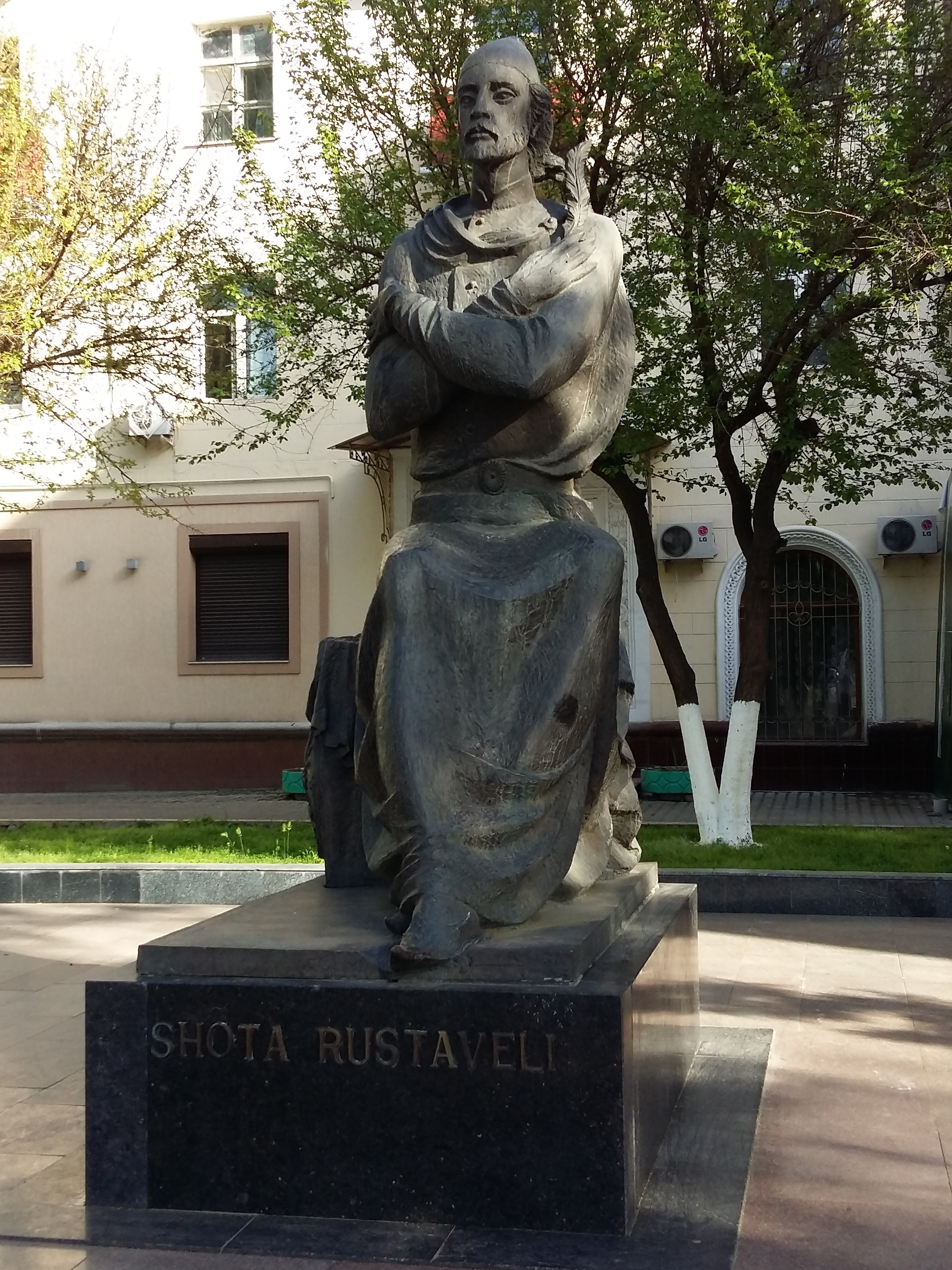
Shota Rustaveli memorial in Uzbekistan

== History ==
“Shota Rustaveli street" was first established under the name of "Summer house street" of Russian Empire in the second half of the 19th century. When it was first opened, the street was the passage to the Turkistan garden, after some years "Shota Rustaveli street" was renamed as the "Zangiota street". However, in the year of 1938 it was renamed to its current name and was called as the "Shota Rustaveli street", under the name of Georgian poet and writer, Shota Rustaveli. After the late 1930s the government started constructing new and modern buildings. After the Independence of Republic of Uzbekistan, the big part of the city, which was about 4 kilometers long it was renamed after the name of Uzbek poet Usman Nasir in the year of 1991. However, after the year of 2000 it was renamed back to its old name, and was called as the "Shota Rustaveli street".

== Constructions ==
“Shota Rustaveli street" plays essential role in the beauty, in social-economic impact and cultural life of Tashkent city. There are number of essential building and constructions which serve to the local people, and they are: “Babur park", "Grand Mir hotel", "Tashkent region court", "Building of International Fund for Saving the Aral Sea", "Embassy of Switzerland", "Saodat" trading center and many other companies. In 1987 Uzbek government has set the monument for the Shota Rustaveli which was made by R.Nemirovski, who was a professional sculptor. After the independence of Uzbekistan the monument for the Russian people poet Alexander Pushkin was replaced to the "Shota Rustaveli street" too.

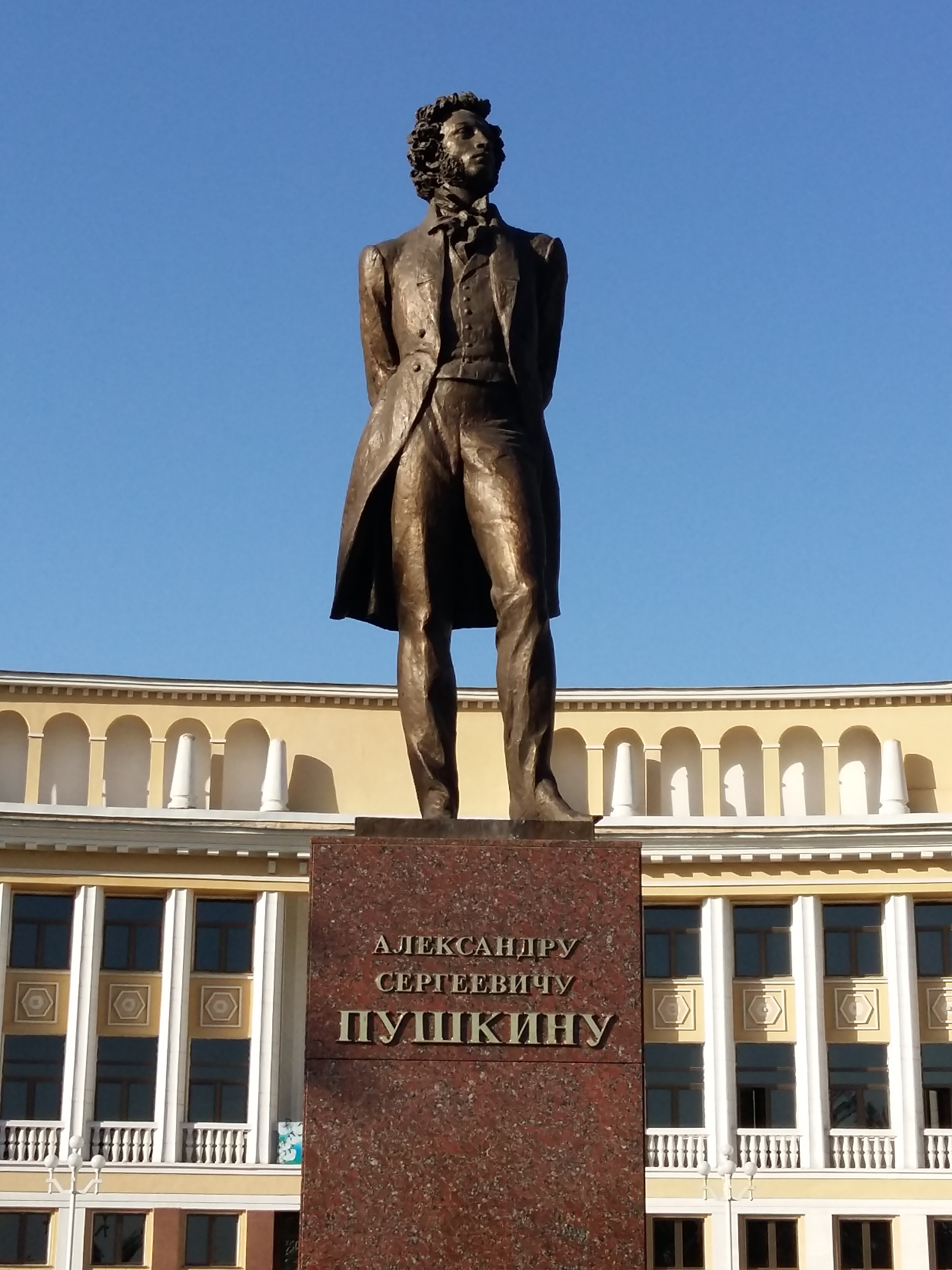
Monument for the Alexander Pushkin at Shota Rustaveli street

== Location ==
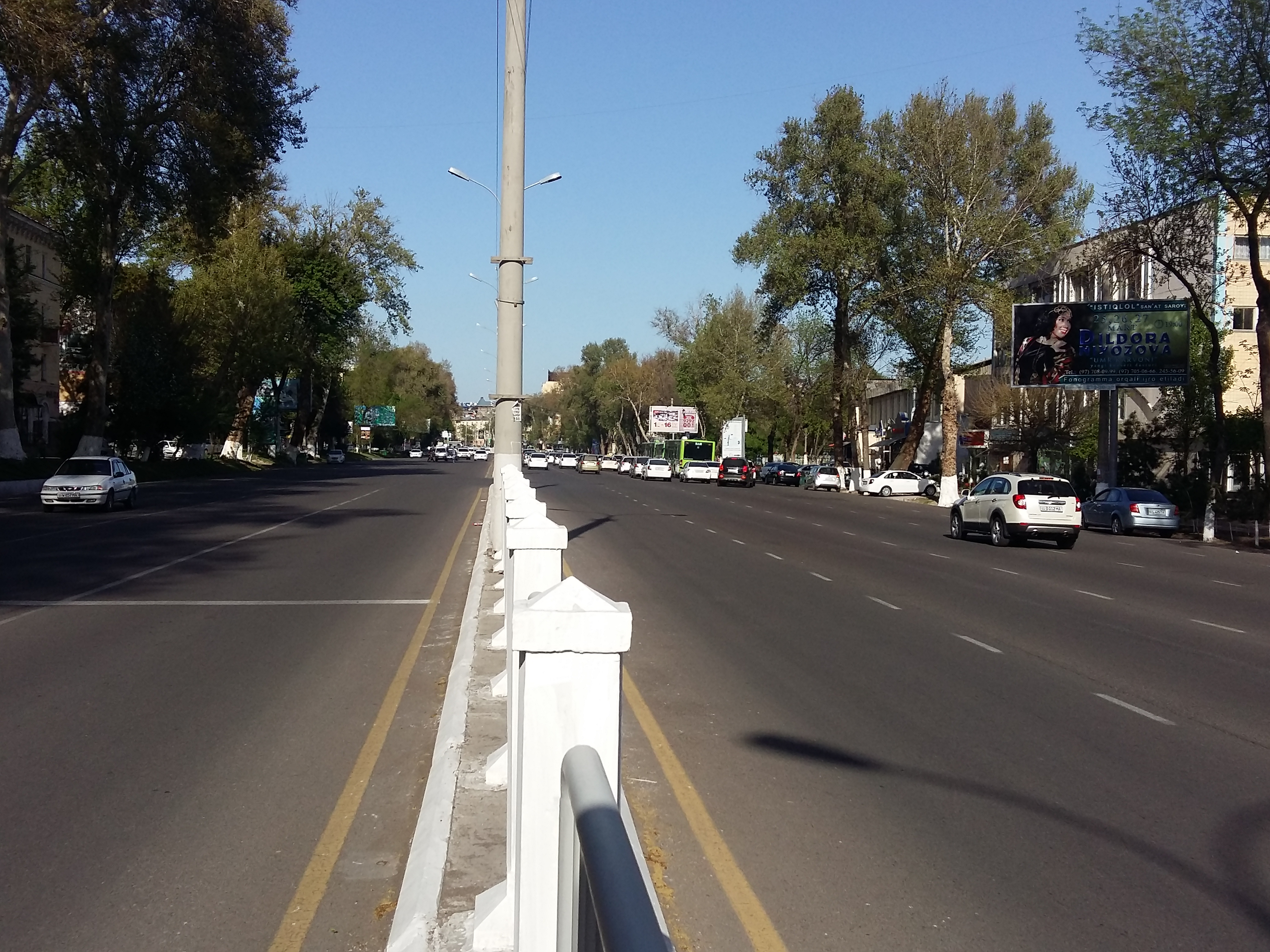
Shota Rustaveli street in Tashkent

“Shota Rustaveli street" is located in the southern part of Tashkent, and it links many big and main streets of Tashkent city, which are: “Shakhrizabz street” and “YangiSergeliyo’li street”. “Shota Rustaveli street” in under the municipal of Yakkasaray district of Tashkent.

== Transport ==
Thousands of people pass away from "Shota Rustaveli street" daily, and the transportation is essential system of the street. There are number of busses and bus-taxis which pass through the "Shota Rustaveli street", and they are given as follows:

- Busses: 2, 12, 18, 33, 38, 40, 48, 57, 58, 69, 80, 81, 90, 98, 131, 134, 135
- Bus-taxis: 12I, 71, 88, 98.
