= Shota Rustaveli Street, Kyiv =

Street in Pecherskyi District, Kyiv, Ukraine

Shota Rustaveli Street
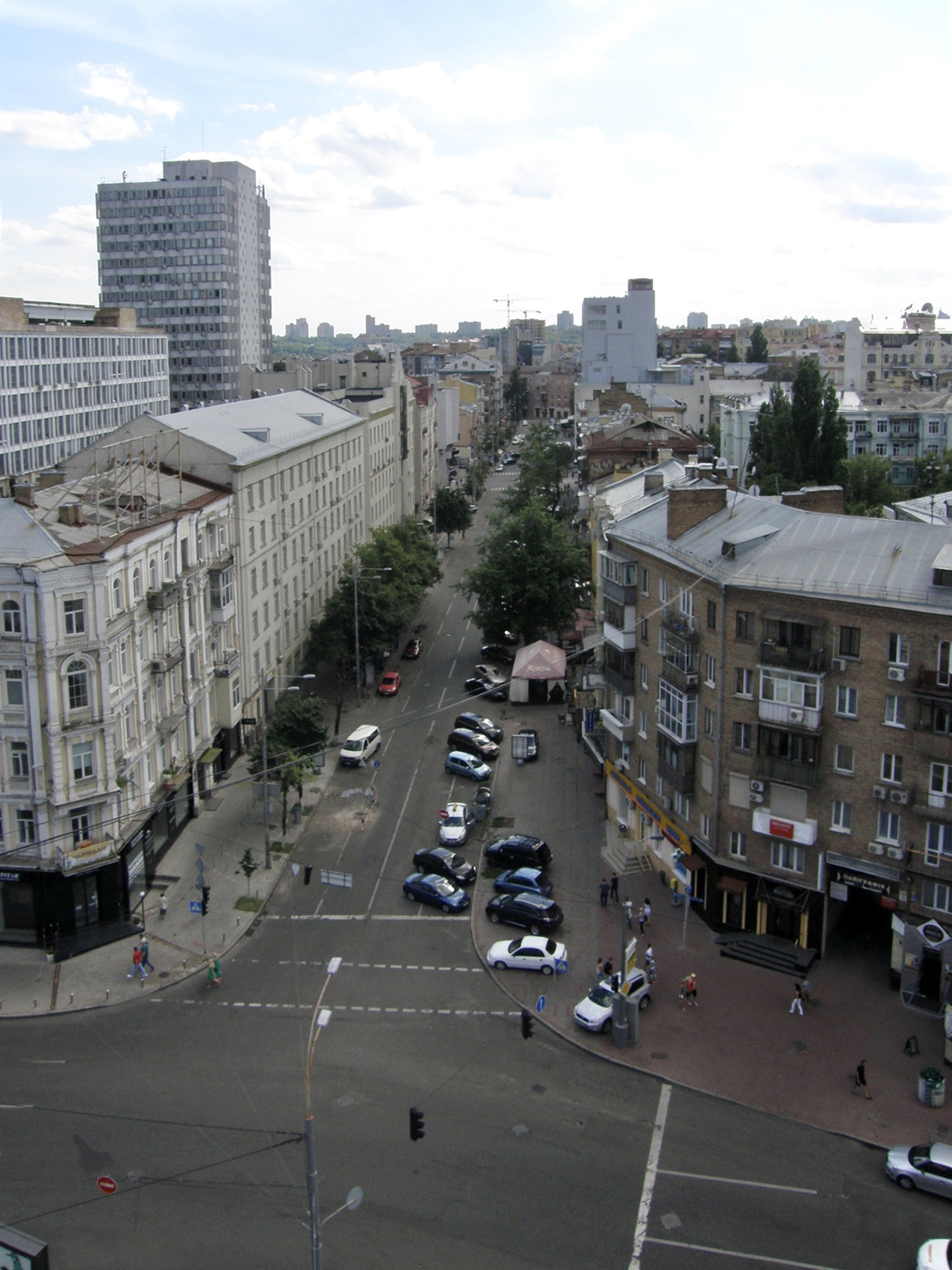
- Beginning of Shota Rustaveli Street at Baseina Street as seen from the northeast
- Native name: Вулиця Шота Руставелі (Ukrainian)
- Length: 850 m (2,790 ft)
- Location: Besarabka, Pecherskyi District; Kyiv, Ukraine
- Postal code: 01001, 01033, 01601

Shota Rustaveli Street (Ukrainian: Вулиця Шота Руставелі, romanized: Vulytsia Shota Rustaveli) is a street in the neighborhood of Besarabka (named after the nearby Bessarabska Square and market) in the Pecherskyi District of Kyiv. It runs from Baseina Street to Zhylianska Street.

== History ==
The street arose in the 1830s in connection with the planning and construction of the area in the valley of the Lybid. At first, it was called Mala Vasylkivska (laid parallel to Velika Vasylkivska). In 1926, it was renamed Borochov Street, in honor of the Jewish public figure Ber Borochov. It received its current name in 1937 in honor of the medieval Georgian poet Shota Rustaveli.

== Notable buildings ==
- Brodsky Synagogue
