= SS Klio (1924) =

German cargo ship

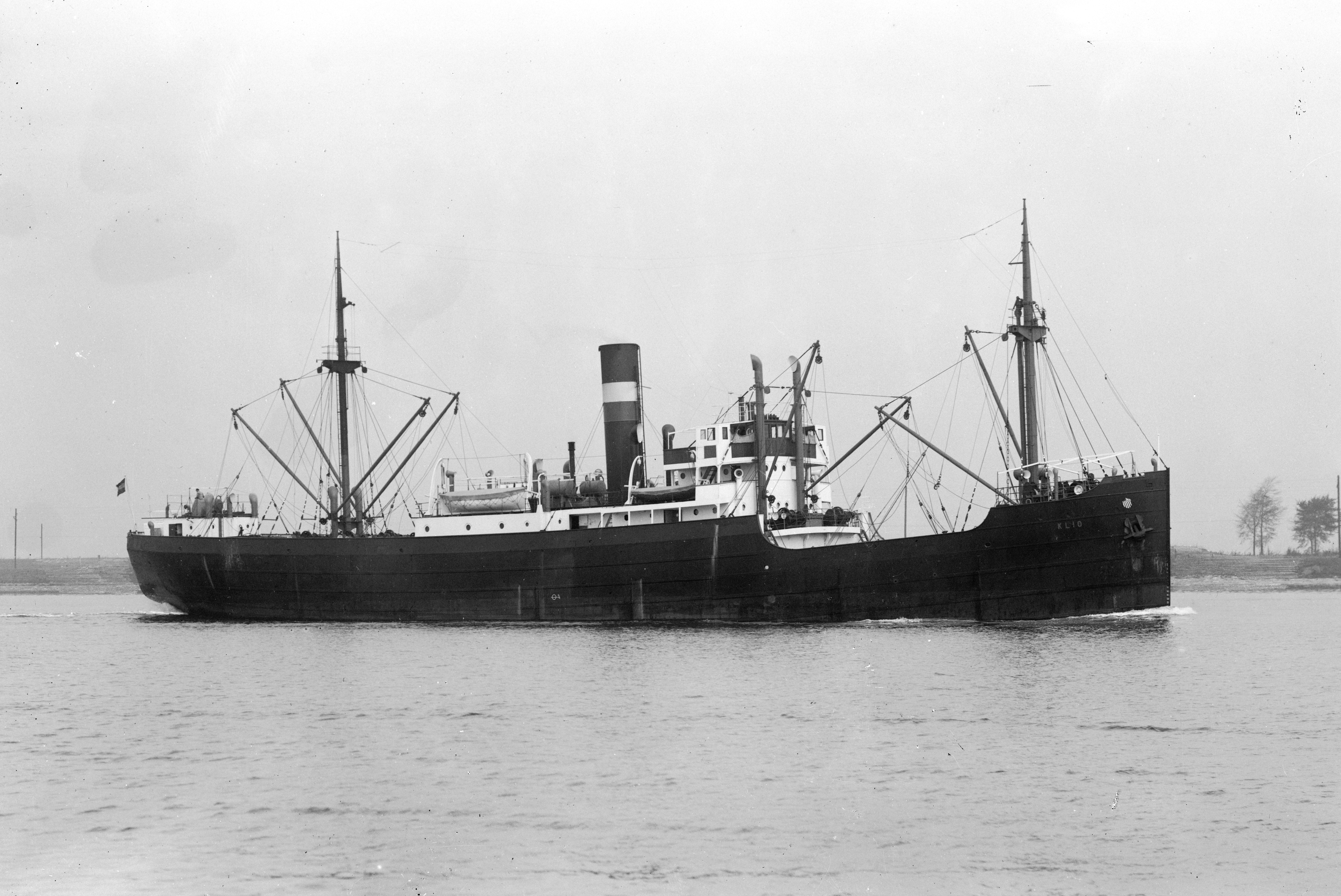
- Klio in Antwerp

History
- Name: Klio (1924-45); Empire Conclyde (1945-46); Shota Rustavelli (1946-1963 or 1964)
- Owner: Neptun Line (1924-45); Ministry of War Transport (1945); Ministry of Transport (1945-46); Soviet Government (1946-1963 or 1964)
- Operator: Neptun Line (1924-45); William Robertson & Co Ltd(1945-46); Sakhalin Shipping Company, Soviet Union (1946-1963 or 1964)
- Port of registry: (Weimar Republic) Bremen (1927-33); (Nazi Germany) Bremen (1933-45); (United Kingdom) London (1945-50); (Soviet Union) Kholmsk (1946-1963 or 1964)
- Builder: AG Weser
- Yard number: 394
- Launched: December, 1924
- Commissioned: 7 January 1925
- Decommissioned: end of 1963
- Identification: Code Letters QLWR (1924-34); Code Letters DONP (1934-45); Code Letters GSPZ (1945-46); German Official Number 2467 (1927-45); United Kingdom Official Number 180740 (1945-46); Code Letters UKID (1946-63)

General characteristics
- Tonnage: 1,403 GRT; 685 NRT
- Length: laength overall 251 ft 0 in (76.50 m); between perpendiculars 240 ft 8 in (73.36 m)
- Beam: 38 ft 7 in (11.76 m)
- Draught: 15 ft 1 in (4.60 m)
- Depth: 15 ft 2 in (4.62 m)
- Installed power: Triple expansion steam engine
- Propulsion: Screw propeller
- Speed: 10.0 knots (18.5 km/h)
- Crew: 20 crew members and 24 passengers

Klio was a 1,403 GRT cargo ship that was built in 1924 by AG Weser, Bremen, Germany for Neptun Line. In 1945, she was seized by the Allies and passed to the Ministry of War Transport (MoWT), renamed Empire Conclyde. In 1946, she was passed to the Soviet Union and renamed Shota Rustavelli.

== Description ==
The ship was built in 1924 by AG Weser, Bremen.

The ship was a tweendecker (two cargo decks) 240 feet 8 inches (73.36 m) long, with a beam of 38 feet 7 inches (11.76 m) a depth of 15 feet 2 inches (4.62 m). She had a GRT of 1,403 and a NRT of 635.

The ship was propelled by a triple expansion steam engine, which had cylinders of 19 5/8 inches (50 cm), 31 1/2 inches (80 cm) and 53 1/2 inches (136 cm) diameter by 35 7/16 inches (90.0 cm) stroke. The engine was built by AG Weser.

== History ==
=== Klio ===
Klio was built for «Dampfschiffahrts Gesellschaft "Neptun"» AG (Neptun Line), Bremen. Her port of registry was Bremen. The Code Letters QLWR and German Official Number 2467 were allocated.

On 18 September 1925, the steamer пароход was transferred under the management of the combined German-Dutch company «Deutsch-Niederlandische Finanzabkommen GmbH», Berlin. However, she returned to the company «Dampfschifffahrts Gesellschaft "Neptun"», Bremen, on 7 March 1930.

In 1934, the ship's Code Letters were changed to DONP.

At the beginning of World War II the ship Klio based at the Spanish ports of Bilbao and el Musel. The steamer delivered goods to the southern ports of France from 18 September 1940.

=== Empire Conclyde ===
In May 1945, Klio was seized by the Allies at Rendsburg. She was passed to the MoWT and renamed Empire Conclyde. She was placed under the management of William Robertson & Co Ltd, Glasgow. Her port of registry was changed to London and the Code Letters GSPZ, and United Kingdom Official Number BR № 180740.

=== Шота Руставели ===
In March 1946, as per repatriation, Empire Conclyde was transferred to the Soviet Union, renamed Shota Rustavelli (Russian: Шота Руставели) signed on to Sakhalin Shipping Company. The ship sailed from London on 19 March 1946. Destination port was Odessa, for repair. The ship visited Gibraltar during 27–29 March 1946. She passed Istanbul, Bosphorus Strait, on 8 April 1946.

After repair Шота Руставели sailed from Odessa to Far East and passed Istanbul, Bosphorus Strait, on 2 August and passed Suez Canal during 8–11 August 1946. The ship visited:

- Djibouti on 18 and 19 August,
- Aden during 19–24 August,
- Colombo during 5–11 September,
- Hong Kong during 7–10 October 1946.

After regular repair in Vladivostok the ship arrived in own home port Kholmsk, Sakhalin Shipping Company. The ship Шота Руставели Call sign was UKID (Russian: УКИД).

The cargo ship Shota Rustavelli was decommissioned and withdrawn from the ship's list of the Sakhalin Shipping Company in the end of 1963.

=== Other ships Шота Руставели. ===
New Soviet passenger ship Shota Rustaveli (Russian: Шота Руставели) was built for the Soviet Union in 1968.

Pay attention please that cargo ship Шота Руставели (1925) was named in English Shota Rustavelli (double L), and passenger ship Шота Руставели (1968) had English name Shota Rustaveli (single L).

== Photos ==
- Шота Руставели at anchor.
- Шота Руставели alongside the berth.
