= Shota Rustaveli =

Georgian poet (c. 1160 – after c. 1220)

Shota Rustaveli შოთა რუსთაველი
- Fresco of Rustaveli in the Monastery of the Cross in Jerusalem
- Born: Rustavi, Meskheti; Kingdom of Georgia
- Died: Jerusalem
- Resting place: Monastery of the Cross; Jerusalem (undisclosed)
- Citizenship: Kingdom of Georgia
- Education: Gelati academy Ikalto academy Academy in Byzantine Empire
- Occupations: poet, thinker, statesman, prince, treasurer
- Writing career
- Pen name: Rustveli; Meskhetian poet
- Language: Middle Georgian
- Period: Reign of King Tamar; Georgian Golden Age
- Genres: poetry, national epic
- Notable work: The Knight in the Panther's Skin

Shota Rustaveli (Georgian: შოთა რუსთაველი, c. 1160 – after c. 1220), known mononymously as Rustaveli, was a medieval Georgian poet. He is considered to be the pre-eminent poet of the Georgian Golden Age and one of the greatest contributors to Georgian literature. Rustaveli was the author of The Knight in the Panther's Skin, a Georgian national epic poem.

== Biography ==
Little, if anything, is known about Rustaveli from contemporary sources. Shota Rustaveli was born in 1160. He started serving Queen Tamar as a Minister of Finance in 1191. His poem itself, namely the prologue, provides a clue to his identity: the poet identifies himself as "a certain Rustveli." "Rustveli" is not a surname, but a territorial epithet that can be interpreted as "of/from/holder of Rustavi"; although a 10th century manuscript fragment found in 1975 in Saint Catherine's Monastery in Sinai attests to its use as a cognomen by a noble house of Ru(i)staveli. Later Georgian authors from the 15th through 18th centuries are more informative; they are almost unanimous in identifying him as Shota Rustaveli, a name that is preserved on a fresco and a document from the formerly Georgian Monastery of the Holy Cross at Jerusalem. The fresco was described by the Georgian pilgrim Timote Gabashvili in 1757/58 and rediscovered by a team of Georgian scholars in 1960. The same Jerusalem document speaks of Shota as a sponsor of the monastery and a mechurchletukhutsesi ("high treasurer"), echoing a popular legend that Rustaveli was a minister at Queen Tamar’s court and retired to the monastery at an advanced age.

Both a folk tradition and the 17th-century royal poet Archil II identify Rustaveli as a native of the southern Georgian region of Meskheti, where his home village Rustavi was located (in modern-day Aspindza Municipality, not to be confused with the modern-day city of Rustavi near Tbilisi). A legend states that Rustaveli was educated at the medieval Georgian academies of Gelati and Ikalto, and then in "Greece" (i.e., the Byzantine Empire). He must have produced his major work no earlier than the 1180s and no later than the first decade of the 13th century, most probably 1205-1207.

Rustaveli was well acquainted with Persian "and was therefore able to read and appreciate its poetry without having to resort to faulty translations". Rustaveli may have composed Persian verse as well.

== The Knight in the Panther's Skin ==
The Knight in the Panther's Skin is a celebrated medieval epic poem written by Shota Rustaveli. It is considered the national epic of Georgia and one of the greatest works of Georgian literature. Although the poem takes place in the fictional settings of "India" and "Arabia," events in these distant lands are but a colorful allegory of the rule of King Tamar of Georgia and the size and glory of the Kingdom of Georgia in its Golden Age. The poem has been translated into many languages. It was first printed in 1712 in the Georgian capital, Tbilisi. The manuscripts of The Knight in the Panther's Skin occupy an important place among the works produced in Georgia. Two folios of this text, dating from the 16th century, are preserved at the Georgian National Center of Manuscripts in Tbilisi, and some lines of the poem, dating from the 14th century, are also kept there. All other known copies of the poem date from the 17th century.

== Rustaveli's Fresco in Jerusalem ==
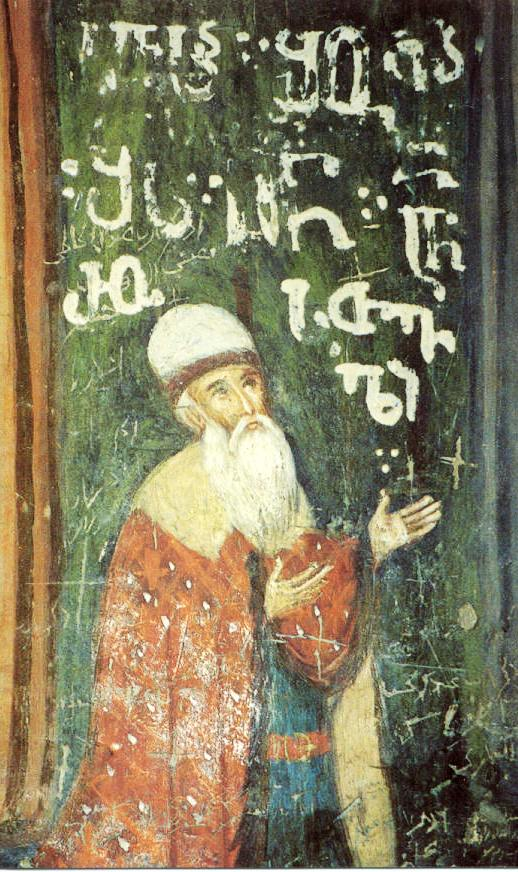
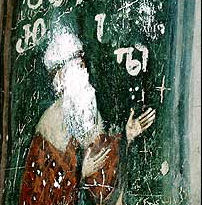
Fresco of Rustaveli before and after being vandalized in 2004

The only known contemporary portrait of Shota Rustaveli was painted on the eastern face of the southwest pillar of the church of the Monastery of the Holy Cross in Jerusalem. It is set at the foot of two much larger images of saints and is accompanied by a Georgian-language inscription.

The portrait was vandalized in June 2004 by an unknown perpetrator, who scratched out Rustaveli's face and part of the accompanying Georgian inscription with his name. Georgia officially complained to Israel after the priceless fresco was defaced. The portrait and inscription have been restored.

== Legacy ==
The highest Georgian state prize in the fields of art and literature is the Shota Rustaveli State Prize. Tbilisi's main thoroughfare is Rustaveli Avenue. In Tbilisi, one can also find the Rustaveli Theatre, the Shota Rustaveli Institute of Georgian Literature of the Georgian National Academy of Sciences, the Shota Rustaveli Tbilisi International Airport and the Rustaveli metro station, among many other landmarks bearing his name.

Rustaveli has been featured on the 100 Georgian lari bill since the introduction of the currency in 1995. In 2001 Israel and Georgia jointly issued postage stamps to honor Shota Rustaveli.

Streets in a number of cities in the former Soviet Union are named after Rustaveli, including in Moscow, Saint Petersburg (Russia), Kyiv, Lviv (Ukraine), Tashkent (Uzbekistan), Yerevan, Gyumri (Armenia), and elsewhere, such as pathway in Jerusalem, which leads to the Monastery of the Cross.

Mihály Zichy, a 19th-century Hungarian painter, rose to the rank of "national painter" in Georgia as he produced the classic illustrations that have been frequently used in editions of Rustaveli's poetry. A sculpture and a street commemorate Zichy's work in Tbilisi. Georgian composer Tamara Vakhvakhishvili set Rustaveli's poetry to music in her composition Citation for voice and orchestra.

Oxford Interfaith Forum organised a multilingual conference dedicated to the 65th Anniversary of the Recovery of Shota Rustaveli's fresco. The conference participants presented Rustaveli's poem in twelve languages.

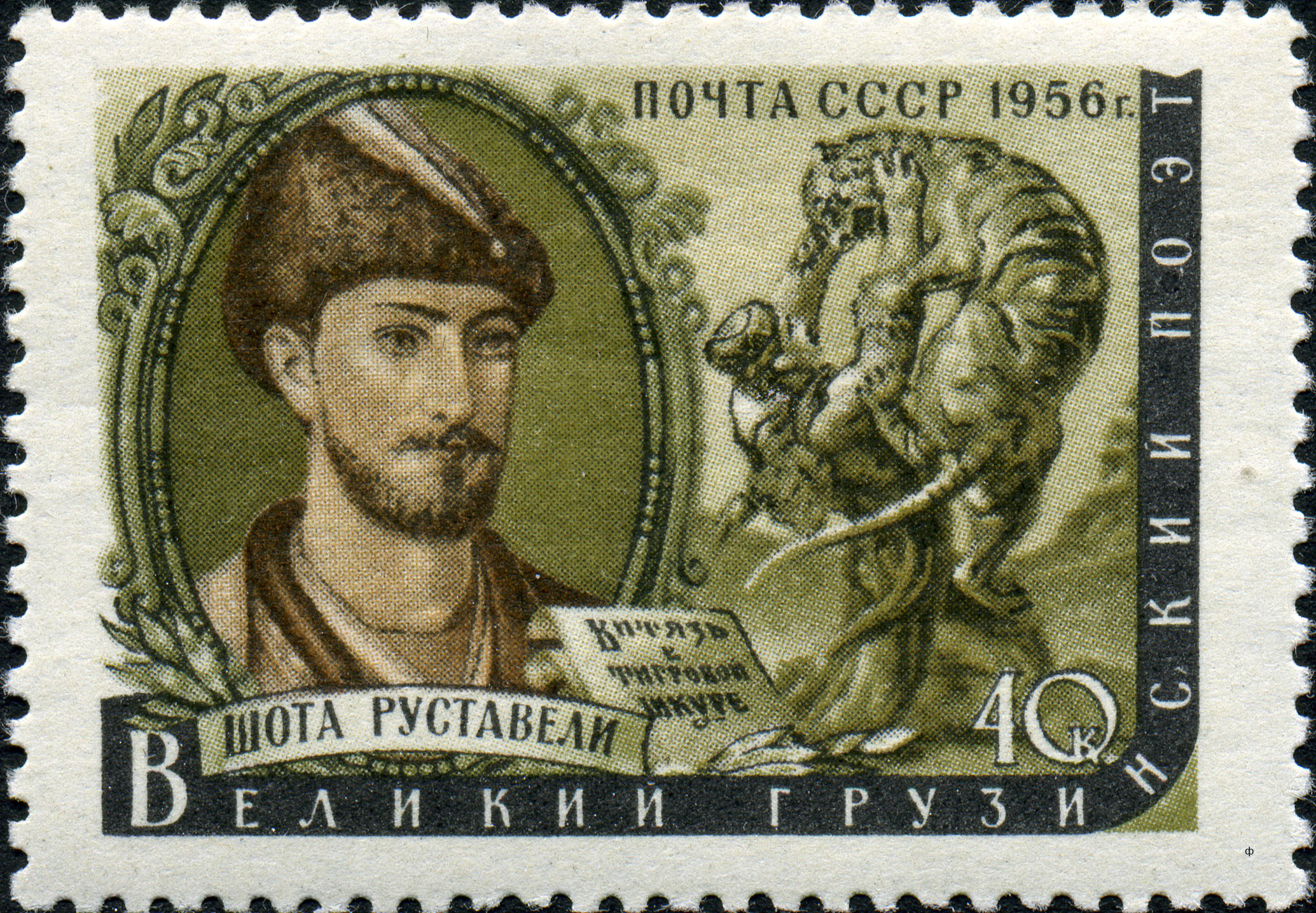
1956 Soviet stamp

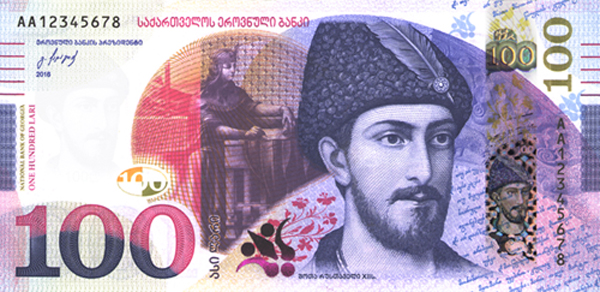
2016 100 Georgian lari Banknote depicting Rustaveli

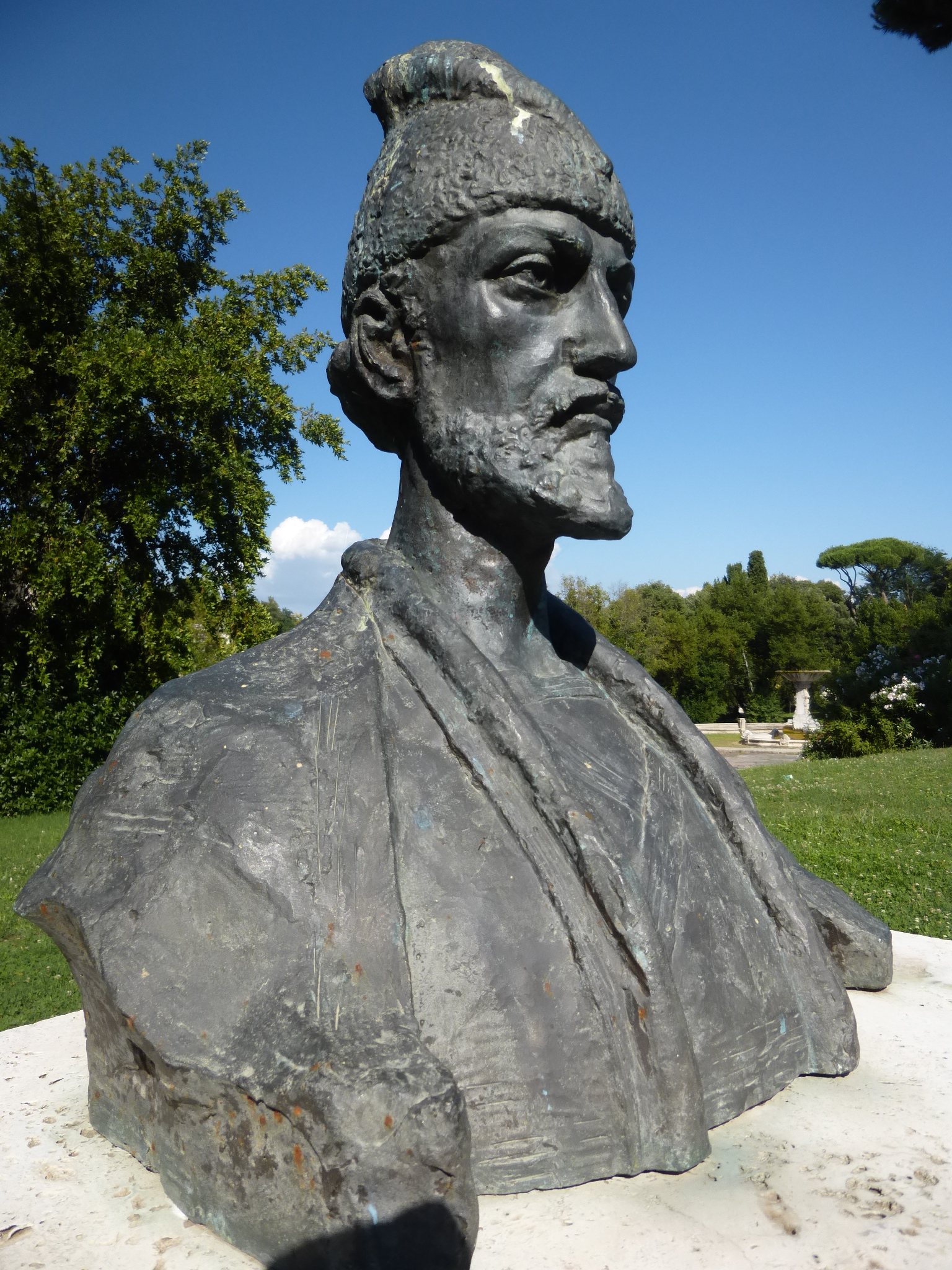
Rustaveli bust in Rome

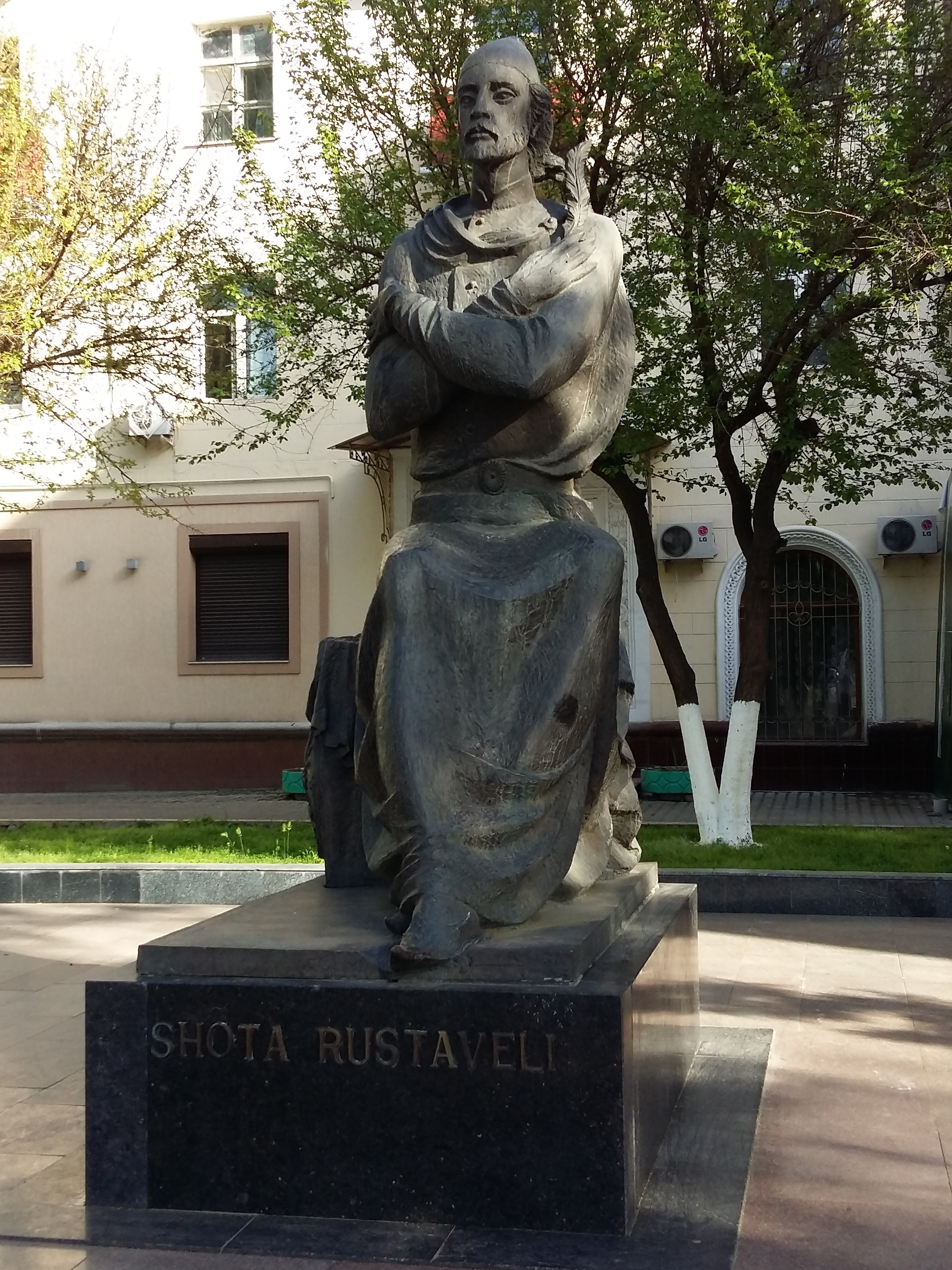
Tashkent, Uzbekistan

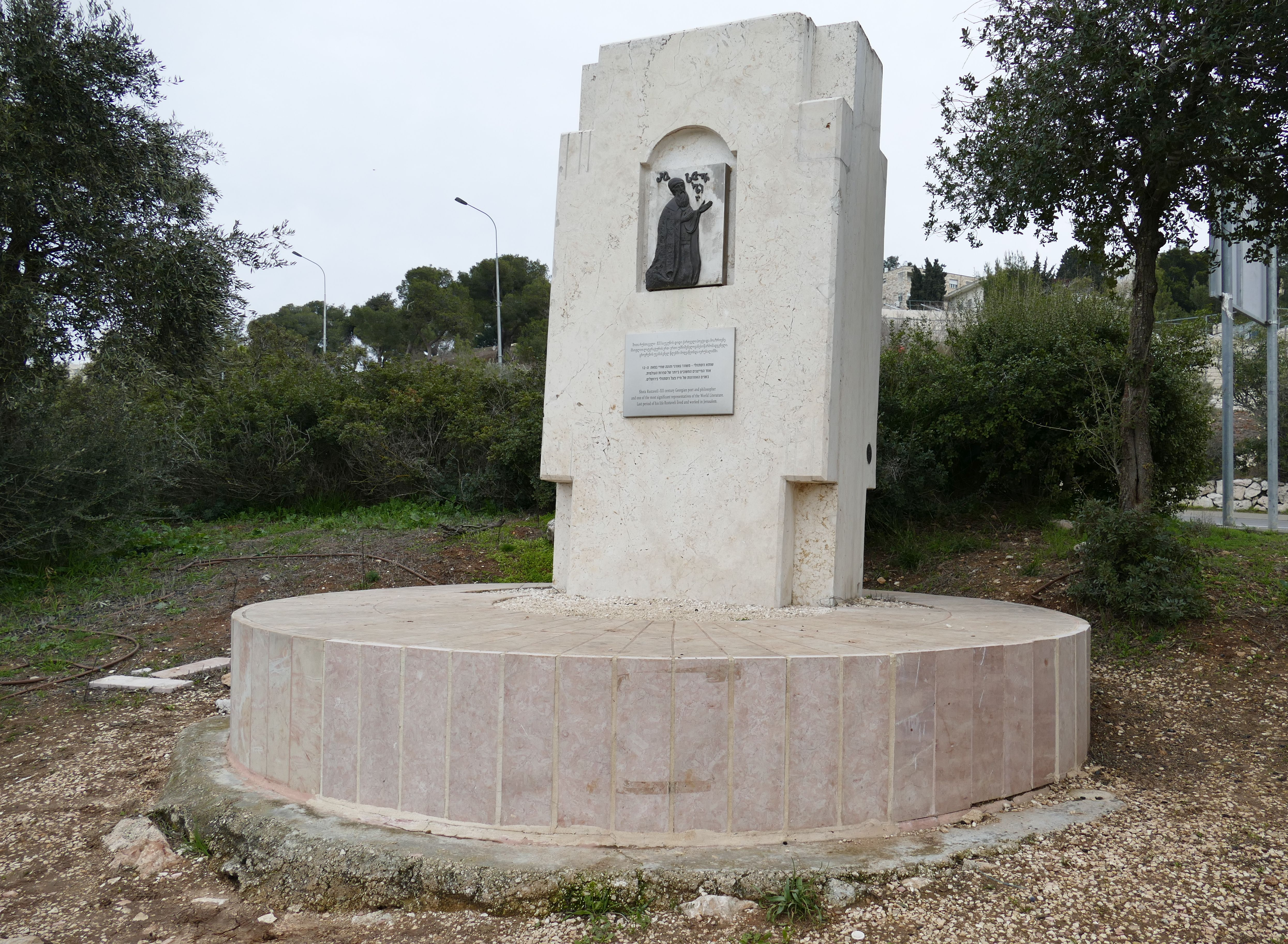
Memorial monument for Shota Rustaveli near the Monastery of the Holy Cross in Jerusalem

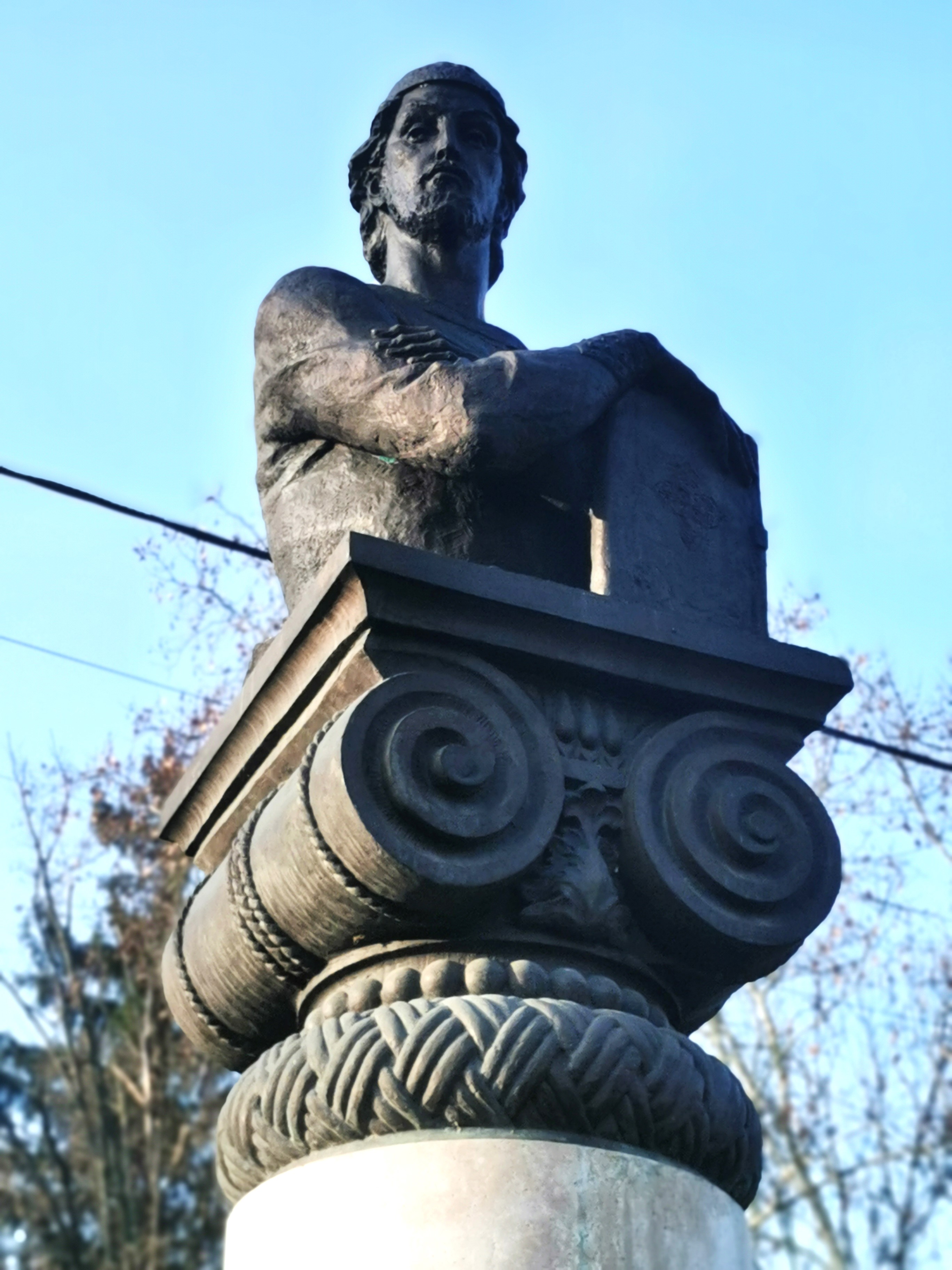
Rustaveli bust in Budapest

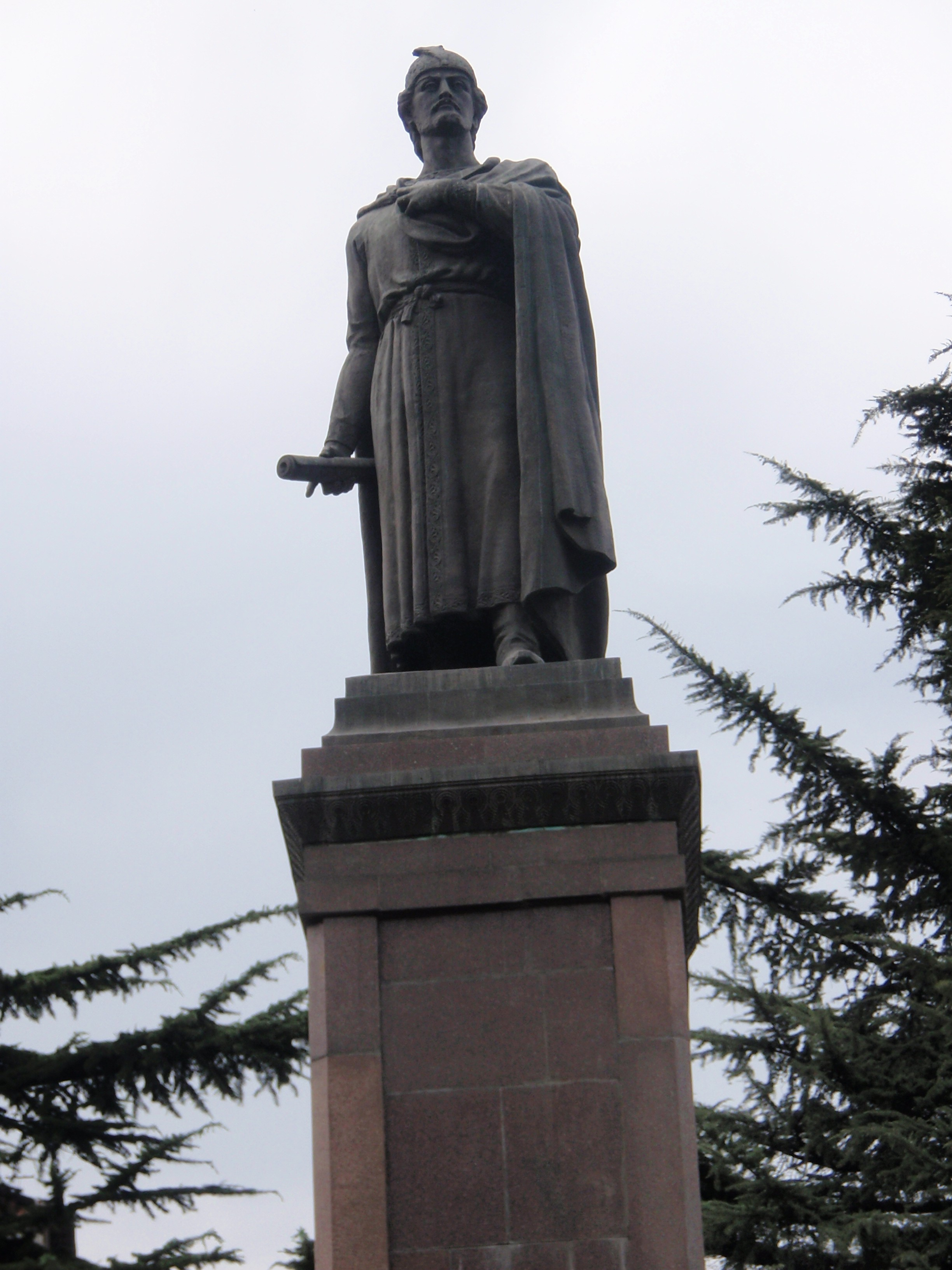
Rustaveli Monument in Tbilisi

== Sources ==
- Farmanfarmaian, Fatema Soudavar (2009). Arjomand, Saïd Amir (ed.). "Georgia and Iran: Three Millennia of Cultural Relations An Overview". Journal of Persianate Studies. 2 (1). BRILL: 1–43. doi:10.1163/187471609X445464.
- The 65th Anniversary of the Recovery of the Shota Rustaveli Fresco in Jerusalem Oxford Interfaith Forum. 2025.
- Rustaveli in Jewish Land: Shared Material Culture.

== Literature ==
- Tite Margwelaschwili. "Der Mann in Pantherfell".- "Georgica", London, 1936 (in German)
- Zviad Gamsakhurdia. "Tropology of The Knight in the Panther's Skin" (a monograph), Tbilisi, 1991, 352 pp (in Georgian, English summary)
- Shota Rustaveli. The Lord of the Panther-Skin, Albany: SUNY Press, 1977, 240 pp, translated by R.H. Stevenson, UNESCO Collection of representative works: Series of translations from the literatures of the Union of Soviet Socialist republics
- Shota Rustaveli. The Man in the Panther's Skin, London: The Royal Asiatic Society of Great Britain and Ireland, 1912, translated by Marjory Scott Wardrop, repr. 1966.
- Shota Rustaveli. The Knight in Panther Skin, London: The Folio Society, 1977, A free translation in prose by Katharine Vivian.
- Beynen, G. Koolemans. "Murder, Foul and Fair, in Shota Rustaveli's The Man in the Panther Skin", in Medieval and Early Modern Murder, Larissa Tracy, ed. (Woodbridge: The Boydell Press, 2018), pp. 350–70.
