= Farshid =

- Gender: male
- Language: Persian

Origin
- Language: Old Persian
- Meaning: Splendour; Sunshine; Bright as the sun
- Region of origin: Iran

Other names
- Related names: Farshad, Farhad,

Farshid (or Farsheed) is a Persian proper name. It consists from two morphemes, far (splendour, shine) + shîd (sun, sun beams). In this manner we could translate the Old Persian proper name Farshid/Farsheed as "sunshine" or "the splendor or the pomp of the sun". This name is commonly used in Iran.

== People with the given name Farshid ==
- Farshid Faramandi, Iranian freelancer
- Farshid Bagheri, Iranian footballer
- Farshid Delshad, Iranian linguist and writer who lives in Germany
- Farshid Esmaeili, Iranian football player
- Farshid Guilak, American engineer and Professor of Orthopaedic Surgery at Washington University
- Farshid Jamshidian, finance researcher and academic working in the United States and the Netherlands
- Farshid Karimi, Iranian football goalkeeper
- Farshid Manafi, Iranian radio presenter and producer
- Farshid Mesghali, Iranian painter and book illustrator
- Farshid Moussavi, Professor of Architecture at Harvard Graduate School of Design
- Farshid Talebi, Iranian football player
- Farshid Fakhri, Iranian artist
- Farshid Chini, Iranian scientist in the field of nanotechnology at University of Tehran
- Farshid Torabian, Professor of Architecture, Landscape Architecture, and Urban Design

== Fictional characters ==
- A character in Shahnameh (brother of Piran)
