= Farshad =

Farshad is a masculine given name and surname of Persian origin. Notable people with the name include:

== Given name ==
- Farshad Ahmadzadeh (born 1992), Iranian football midfielder
- Farshad Alizadeh (born 1985), Iranian wrestler
- Farshad Bahadorani (born 1982), Iranian football midfielder
- Farshad Bashir (born 1988), Dutch tax adviser and former politician of Afghan descent
- Farshad Falahatzadeh (born 1967), retired Iranian football player and now manager
- Farshad Faraji (born 1994), Iranian football winger
- Farshad Mobasher Fard, Iranian citizen expelled from France for alleged link to Iran's nuclear program
- Farshad Fatemi (born 1973), Iranian economist
- Farshad Fotouhi (born 1957), American university dean
- Farshad Ghanbari (born 1989), Iranian rapper and composer
- Farshad Ghasemi (born 1993), Iranian football player
- Farshad Hashemi (born 1997), Iranian footballer
- Farshad Janfaza (born 1993), Iranian football forward
- Farshad Khazei (born 1965), Iranian born entrepreneur living in Hungary
- Farshad Majedi (born 1979), Iranian footballer
- Farshad Mohammadi Mehr (born 1994), Iranian footballer
- Farshad Noor (born 1994), Afghan professional football player
- Farshad Ebrahimpour Nourabadi (born 1977), Iranian politician
- Farshad Pious (born 1962), retired Iranian football player
- Farshad Salarvand (born 1988), Iranian football player
- Amir Farshad Ebrahimi (born 1975), Iranian militia member
- Artimes Farshad Yeganeh (born 1981), Iranian rock climber

== Surname ==
- Aryana Farshad, Iranian writer, director, and film producer

== See also ==
- Farhad
- Farsa
- Fasad
