= Khazei =

Khazei is a surname. Notable people with the surname include:

- Alan Khazei (born 1961), American social entrepreneur
- Farshad Khazei (born 1965), Iranian-born entrepreneur in Hungary
- Kim Khazei, American news anchor
