= Shairi =

Georgian poetic form

A shairi (Georgian: შაირი, pronounced [ˈʃa.i.ɾi]), also known as Rustavelian quatrain, is the name of a particular poetic form, or a monorhymed quatrain. It was used by the Georgian poet Shota Rustaveli in The Knight in the Panther's Skin.

It consists of four 16-syllable lines, with a caesura between syllables eight and nine. While there are stanzas with as many as five syllables rhyming, generally shairi uses either feminine or dactylic rhyme. It is worth noticing that despite the feminine and dactylic forms of rhyme, Georgian shairi’s stress is very weak due to the nature of the Georgian language, which is characterized by dynamic and very weak stress placed on antepenultimate syllable in words longer than two syllables and on penultimate in two-syllable words.

The Georgian word shairi derives from Arabo-Persian shi‘r.

== Types ==
Two distinct forms of shairi exist: maghali (high) shairi and dabali (low) shairi. Rustaveli used both types in his poem.

=== Maghali shairi ===
In maghali shairi ("high shairi"), lines are broken into four sections of four syllables, with a caesura after the second section: xxxx xxxx//xxxx xxxx.

=== Dabali shairi ===
In dabali shairi ("low shairi"), each line is broken into four segments of five and three syllables: xxxxx xxx//xxxxx xxx.

== Sources ==
- Green, Nile (2019). "Introduction: The Frontiers of the Persianate World (ca. 800–1900)". In Green, Nile (ed.). The Persianate World: The Frontiers of a Eurasian Lingua Franca. University of California Press. ISBN 978-0520972100.
