= Habib Levy =

Iranian historian and Zionist (1896–1984)

- Born: 1896; Tehran, Qajar Iran
- Died: 1984 (aged 87–88); Los Angeles, U.S.

Habib Levy (1896–1984) is the author of Comprehensive History of the Jews of Iran: The Outset of the Diaspora.

== Early life ==
Habib Levy was born to a middle-class Jewish family in Tehran, Iran. He began his studies as a youth in Paris, France, and was greatly influenced by the social and cultural movements in Europe at the turn of the 20th century. After returning to his native Iran, Levy pursued various memberships and leadership positions in a few local Jewish organizations. In 1920, he was chosen as a board member of the central branch of the Iranian Zionist Movement as Inspector General. In 1926, he was appointed to the post of vice president. During World War II, Levy played a significant role in the transfer of thousands of Jewish children from Poland who had escaped their war-torn birthplace to emigrate to Israel, while temporarily taking refuge among members of the Jewish community of Tehran.

== Research ==
Over the following forty years, Dr. Levy performed extensive research on the history of the Jews of Iran. No such detailed work had ever been done prior to this endeavor. He traveled to many countries and researched various sources in order to obtain the objective documentation necessary to author his book which was first published in Persian in 1960. Levy was still in the active pursuit of his extensive research on the history of Iranian Jews prior to his death at the age of 88 in Los Angeles, California. He is buried in Israel by his family, as he had wished.

In 1998, the University of California Los Angeles created the "Habib Levy Distinguished Visiting Professorship In Judeo-Persian Studies". Tel Aviv University's Center for Iranian Studies has dedicated "The Dr. Habib Levy Program" to the advancement of academic study of the Jews of Iran in his honor.

In 1999, the original three-volume book written by Levy in Persian was edited and abridged by Dr. Hooshang Ebrami, translated into English by George Maschke and published in one volume by Mazda Publishers in Costa Mesa, California.

== Monographs ==
- Comprehensive History of the Jews of Iran (1999). The Quest of the Diaspora. Abridged and edited from Persian by Dr. Hooshang Ebrami. Translated by George W. Maschke. Mazda Publishers, Costa Mesa, CA. ISBN 1-568-59086-5.
- Worldviews and Ideas (2022). Collections of Sociocultural Essays. Edited by Nahid Pirnazar Oberman. Translated and Reviewed by Farshid Delshad. Published by Habib Levy Cultural Foundation, Chino Hills, CA. ISBN 979-8-88627-105-8.
