= The Knight in the Panther's Skin =

Georgia's national epic poem

ვეფხისტყაოსანი
- The Knight in the Panther's Skin
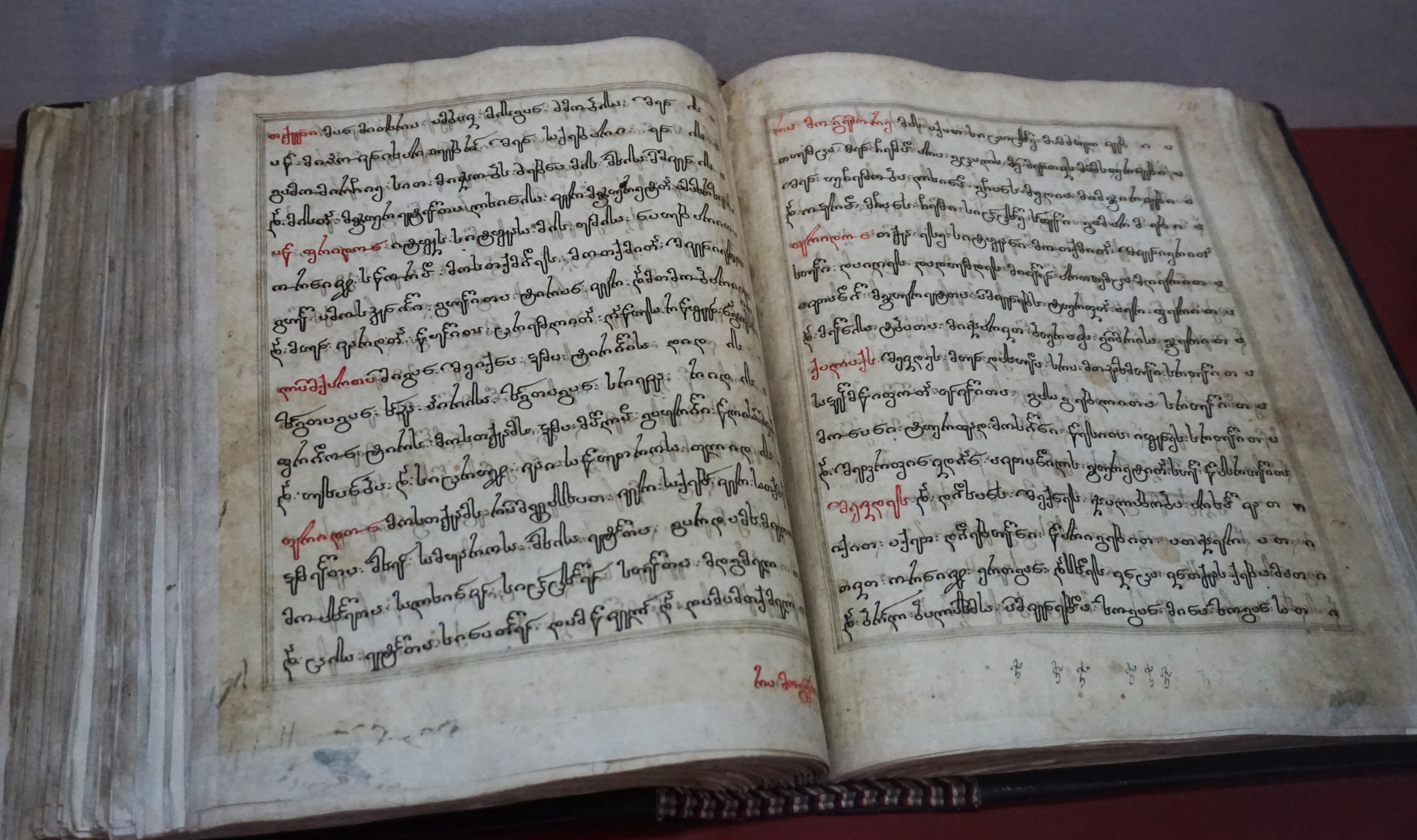
- 17th-century manuscript of Vepkhistkaosani
- Original title: Georgian: ვეფხისტყაოსანი, romanized: vepkhist'q'aosani (lit. "the one with the skin of a tiger")
- Author(s): Shota Rustaveli
- Dedicated to: Queen Tamar of Georgia
- Language: Middle Georgian
- Date: c. 1180–1205/07
- First printed edition: by King Vakhtang VI in 1712
- Genre: Epic poetry, national epic, chivalric romance
- Verse form: Rustavelian quatrain
- Length: 6,648 lines
- Subject: Love, friendship, heroism, loyalty
- Period covered: Reign of King Tamar of Georgia; Georgian Golden Age
- Text: ვეფხისტყაოსანი at Wikisource

The Knight in the Panther's Skin (Georgian: ვეფხისტყაოსანი, romanized: vepkhist'q'aosani pronounced [vepʰχistʼqʼaosani] literally "the one with the skin of a tiger") is a Georgian medieval epic poem, written in the 12th or 13th century by Georgia's national poet Shota Rustaveli. A definitive work of the Georgian Golden Age, the poem consists of over 1600 Rustavelian Quatrains and is considered to be a "masterpiece of Georgian literature". Until the early 20th century, a copy of this poem was part of the dowry of every bride.

Although the poem takes place in the fictional settings of "India" and "Arabia", events in these distant lands are but a colorful allegory of the rule of Queen Tamar of Georgia, and the size and glory of the Kingdom of Georgia in its Golden Age. It tells of the friendship of two heroes, Avtandil and Tariel, and their quest to find the object of love, Nestan-Darejan, an allegorical embodiment of Queen Tamar. These idealized heroes and devoted friends are united by courtly love, generosity, sincerity, and dedication. The poem is regarded as the "coronation of thought, poetic and philosophical art of medieval Georgia", a complex work with rich and transcending genres. It has been described as "epic", "chivalric romance", "epic romance" and "epic poem of lyric poetry." Despite its formal complexity, it bears to this day "the Georgian vision of the world."

== History of the work ==
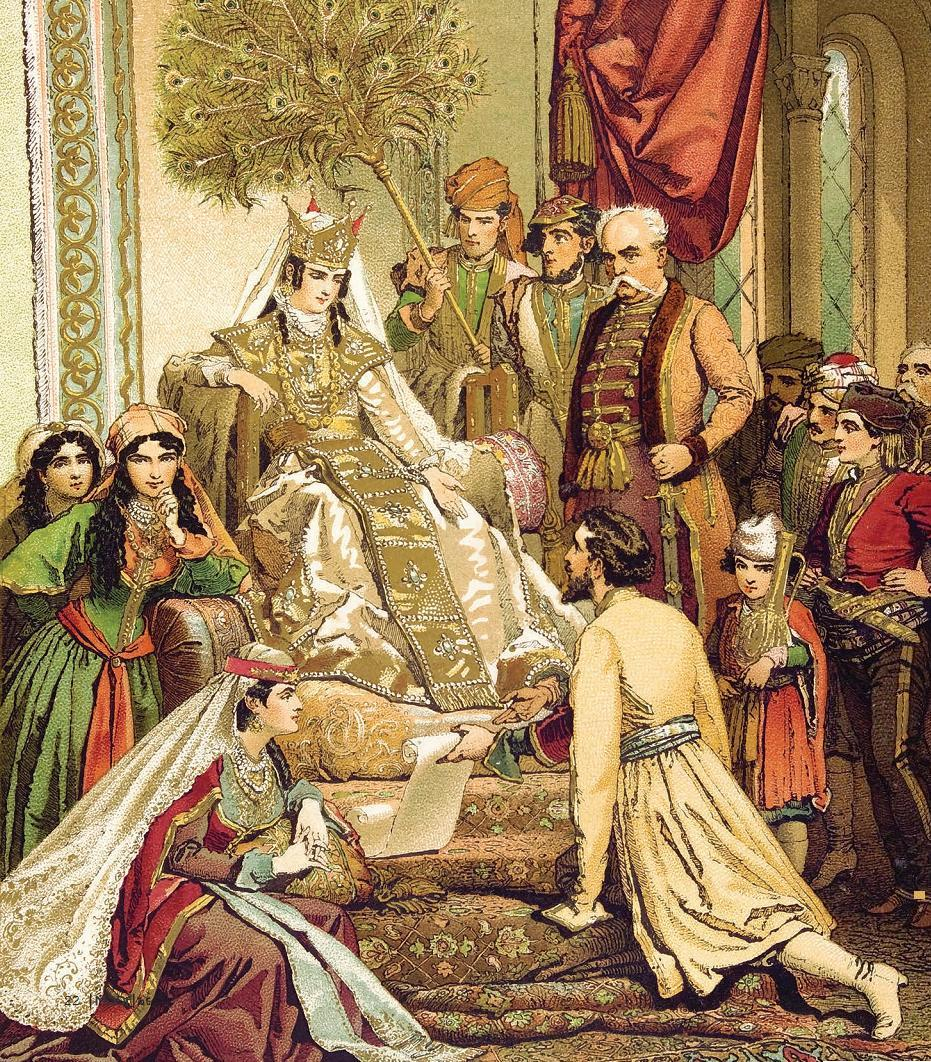
Rustaveli presenting Queen Tamar the epic poem, painting by Mihály Zichy. This is one of 35 paintings made by Zichy under an 1881 commission by Georgian intelligentsia. Impressed by the poem, the artist donated all his works to the Georgian people, refusing any payment.

=== Context and time ===
The poem was written during the Golden Age of the Kingdom of Georgia and the reign of Queen Tamar, who was enthroned by her father King George III of Georgia. Tamar was celebrated by poets for her beauty, intelligence, and diplomatic skills. She expanded the Georgian kingdom to its historical maximum, repulsed invasions, and established protectorates over many area Muslim and Christian lands. Under her reign, the economy prospered. Georgian trading caravans reached Ayyubid Egypt, the Kievan Rus, and the Byzantine Empire. Medieval science developed, and the largest monasteries and churches in Georgia were built. Secular literature developed to the point of equaling the greatest religious texts.

Against the backdrop of this "remarkable growth", Shota Rustaveli composed his poem. Rustaveli, born in Rustavi, a Meskhetian village, was close to Queen Tamar and possibly served as her treasurer. He likely participated in many military campaigns. The stories in his poem are set in faraway lands, but his allegorical representations of contemporaneous Georgia are recognizable. For instance, he refers to wine culture and a female king who became an heir of her father.

In the prologue, Rustaveli says that he wrote this poem to praise the "King" Tamar.

თამარს ვაქებდეთ მეფესა სისხლისა ცრემლ-დათხეული,
ვთქვენი ქებანი ვისნი მე არ-ავად გამორჩეული.
მელნად ვიხმარე გიშრის ტბა და კალმად მე ნა რხეული,
ვინცა ისმინოს, დაესვას ლახვარი გულსა ხეული.

— The Knight in the Panther's Skin: Stanza 4
Translation:

By shedding tears of blood we praise Queen T'hamara,
Whose praises I, not ill-chosen, have told forth.
For ink I have used a lake of jet, and for pen a pliant crystal.
Whoever hears, a jagged spear will pierce his heart!

— Translated by Marjory Scott Wardrop: Stanza 4

And in the epilogue (given here with a formal paraphrase), he praises the queen's king consort David Soslan.

ქართველთა ღმრთისა დავითის, ვის მზე მსახურებს სარებლად,
ესე ამბავი გავლექსე მე მათად მოსახმარებლად,
ვინ არის აღმოსავლეთით დასავლეთს ზართა მარებლად,
ორგულთა მათთა დამწველად, ერთგულთა გამახარებლად.

— The Knight in the Panther's Skin: Stanza 1666
Translation:

For the goddess whom David the sun serves in his course by all rights,
I have put this tale into verse as entertainment for her nights.
She who strikes terror from the East to the West, wherever she fights:
Those who are traitors, she destroys; those who are loyal, she delights.

— Translated by Lyn Coffin: Stanza 1658

=== Genre and style ===
Though written in Georgian at the height of the pan-Caucasian empire of the Georgian Bagratids, according to the modern historian Stephen H. Rapp, The Knight in the Panther's Skin "was an expression of the Iranian/Iranic epic and not some genre of Byzantine literature". Rustaveli used a Persian model for writing The Knight in the Panther's Skin. In the work's prologue, the modern historian Nile Green explains, Rustaveli publicly declares his 1,600-quatrain epic, written in the shairi verse form, as a "Persian tale, translated into Georgian / Like an orphaned pearl, like a toy passed from hand to hand".

== Content and form ==
=== Title ===
Georgian title ვეფხისტყაოსანი (vepkhistqaosani) literally means "one with a skin of vepkhi". The identity of the animal that it refers to is not certain and it can be a tiger, panther or leopard. In modern Georgian, it refers to the tiger. However, according to more modern research it would rather mean a panther. Similarly, the qualification of "knight" is not derived from the original title and its alternative translations exist, such as the "valiant" or simply a "man." The alternative English titles of the poem also are "Lord of the Panther Skin" and "The Man in the Panther's Skin".

=== Story ===
The story can be divided into two parts: the first part is Avtandil's quest for Tariel, the titular "knight in the panther's skin", and the second part is Avtandil's quest for Nestan-Darejan, Tariel's love.

==== Search for Tariel ====
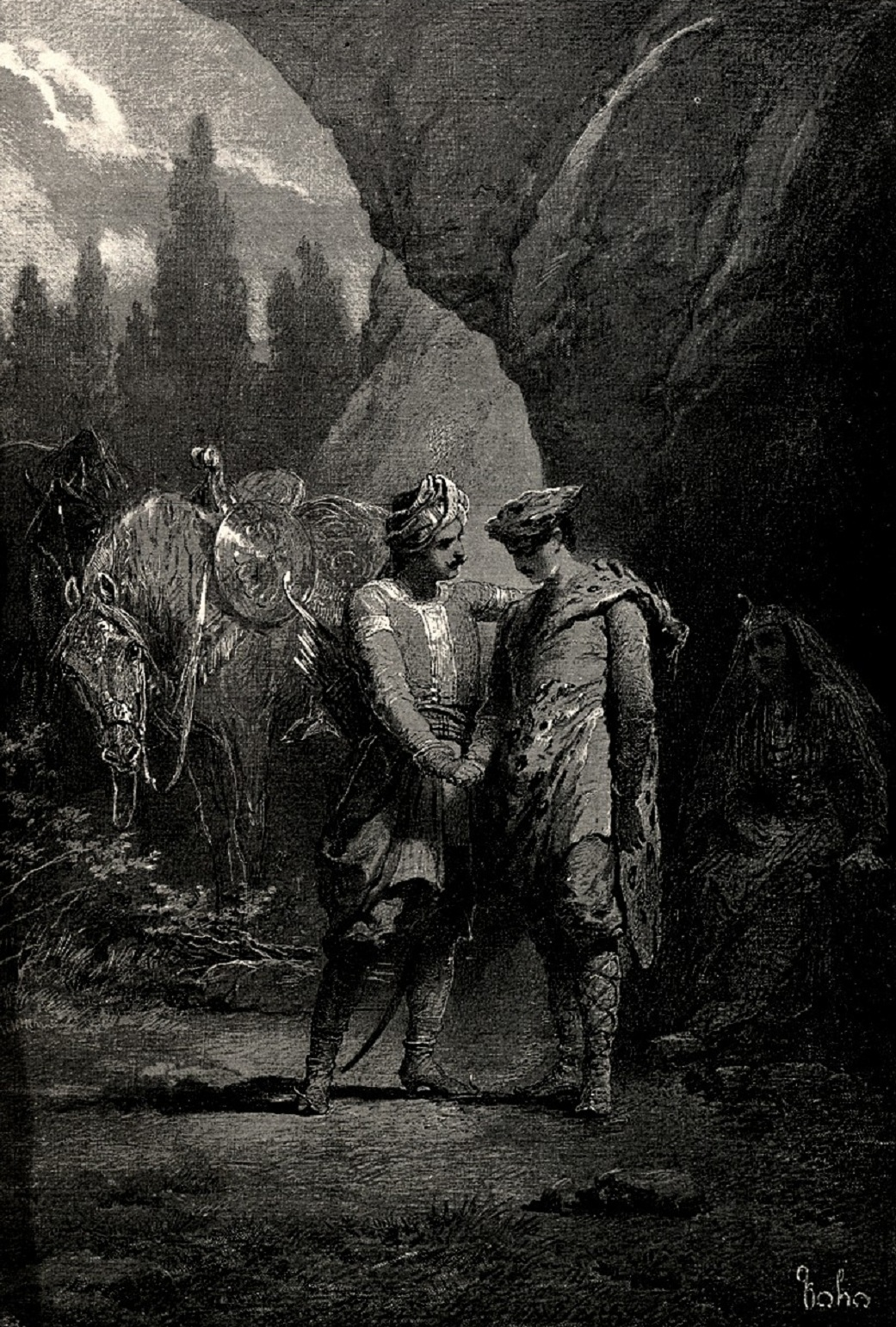
The meeting of Tariel and Avtandil, Mihály Zichy illustration.

The King of Arabia, Rostevan, has no sons and confers the kingship on his only daughter, the beautiful and wise Tinatin. She has a tender affection for Avtandil, the knight and commander-in-chief of Rostevan's armies. One day, Avtandil challenges King Rostevan to a hunting competition. After three days of shooting game, they encounter a knight crying by a river. He is dressed in a panther's skin, and kills the slaves sent by the king to contact him, then disappears. Rostevan sends parties across the world to search for the mysterious knight, but becomes disheartened when he fails.

Tinatin asks Avtandil to find the strange knight within three years, promising him her hand in marriage in return. After two years and nine months of searching, Avtandil finds the knight in the panther's skin hiding in a cave, with only a maiden for company. His name is Tariel, son of King Saridan, who has the seventh kingdom of India. He had served as heir to King Pharsadan, king of the other six kingdoms, for many years before falling in love with Pharsadan's daughter, Nestan-Darejan. Tariel wages war with the Khatavians to earn the favor of Nestan, but is dismayed to learn that she has already been promised to the Khwarezmian prince.

Tariel could not bear the idea of her marriage, and at Nestan's request, he killed the suitor. The princess was placed on a boat and set adrift on the seas. Despite Tariel's lengthy search for his love, he could not find her. Later he met Nuradin-Phridon, ruler of Mulgazanzar, who told him that Nestan was alive but trapped on a distant boat. Tariel retired to a cave to live in the wilderness with Asmat, the former servant and messenger of Nestan. Moved by this story, Avtandil promises his friendship and brotherhood to Tariel, and agrees to help him find his love, Nestan-Darejan. Avtandil returns home to Arabia, and tells Tinatin the story of Tariel. Against King Rostevan's wishes, he returns to his new friend.

==== Search for Nestan-Darejan ====
Avtandil then leaves Tariel to go to the kingdom of Phridon, where he does not hear anything new about Nestan. Continuing his quest, he arrives in the city of Gulansharo. He meets Patman, the wife of the chief Usen, who falls in love with him. Avtandil, sensing she knows the fate of Nestan, succumbs to Patman's seduction. She tells him she has been keeping Nestan at her place and, as Nestan was promised to the king's son, Patman helped her escape, but in her flight Nestan was abducted by Kaji the demon king. Avtandil then returns home to Phridon and to the cave of Tariel and later all three friends decide to go to the country of Kaji with an army of three hundred men to find and deliver Nestan. When she is released, all return to Arabia, where King Rostevan forgives Avtandil his flight and breaking the king's order. They all celebrate the marriage of the latter with the king's only daughter, Tinatin. They then leave for India where Tariel marries his love Nestan. Phridon also returns to his homeland and the three friends reign happily with prosperity and generosity in their own respective realms.

== Places and characters ==
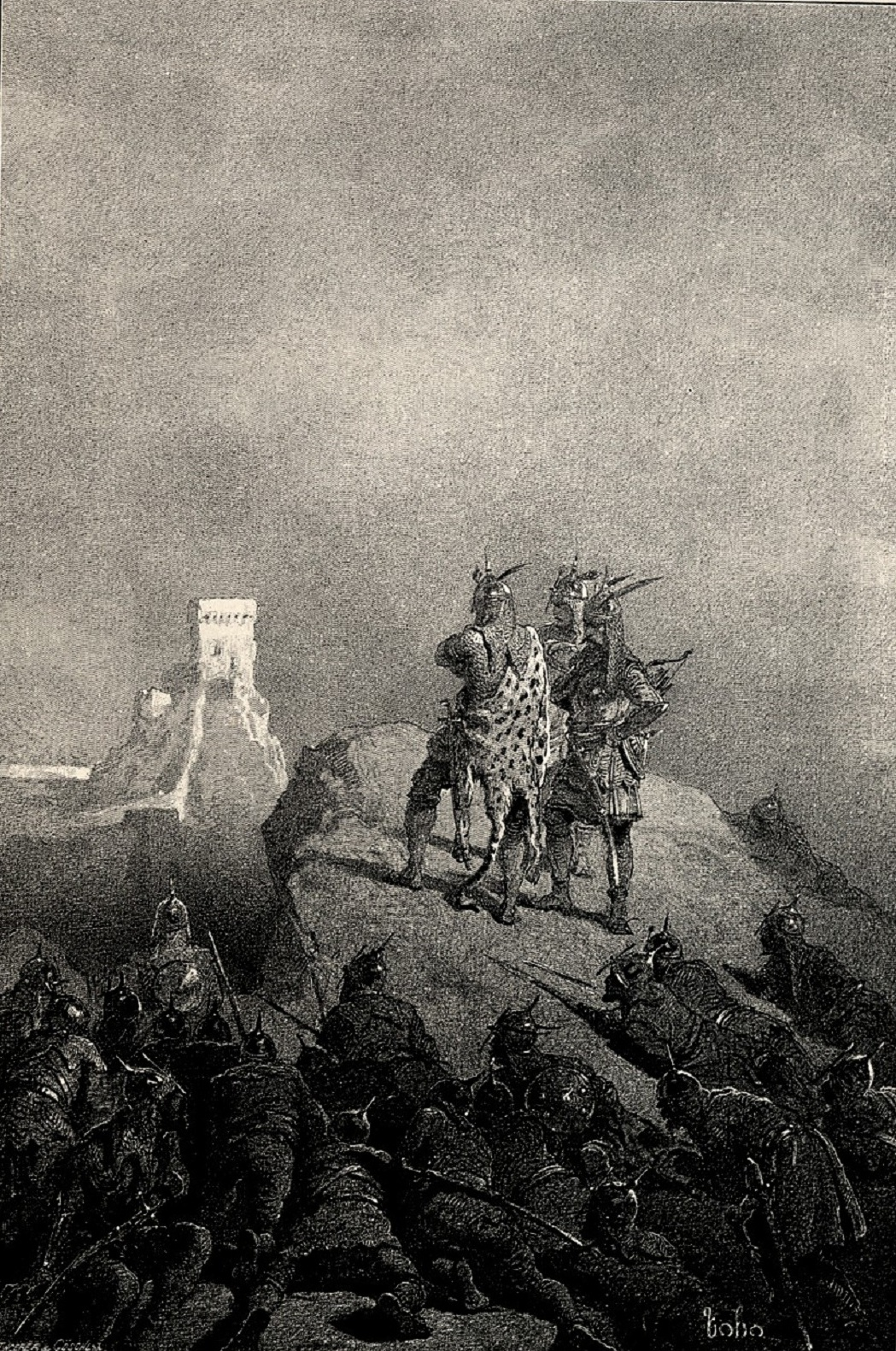
Tariel, Avtandil and Pridon looking at the Kajeti fortress, Mihály Zichy illustration.

=== Places ===
The poem is placed far away from Georgia in countries that the poet has certainly never visited: Arabia, India and "Khataeti", that is to say, China. The indications are vague and do not designate any particular site. It is the Georgian kingdom that has existed through these distant lands. It seems that the choice of places refers primarily to the national character of these peoples: the Arabs are portrayed as more rational, as the king Rostevan and his knight Avtandil with their communication skills and action help to break deadlocks. Conversely, the Indians appear to be more emotional and impulsive and cause unintended disasters, as of the image of Tariel and Nestan. Other locations mentioned as the Kajeti or country of Kaj demons are imaginary. Gulansharo, capital of the "Kingdom of the Seas", has been compared to Venice.

=== Characters ===
The brave and loyal knights — Avtandil and Tariel

These two characters represent the most devoted friends, and tender lovers; both heroes capable of courtly love and men endowed with free will. They initially were actively involved and served the kingdoms held position of modern "steward" or "Mayor of the Palace". Besides their position they only obey their beloveds, therefore their love and dedication is unwavering. The mutual commitment and friendship they swear, also extends to a third person, Nuradin-Pridon, who is also endowed with the same heroic qualities. Tariel is, however, distinguished by his wild character as symbolized by his wearing the panther's skin. The qualities associated with the cat, his dedication and courage, his hatred and violence could be extreme and uncontrollable. It is also close to Saint George slaying the dragon whose cult was particularly strong in the 12th century especially in the episode where Tariel kills a lion and a panther.

The faithful and patient lovers — Tinatin and Nestan-Darejan

Although they take little action, the female characters, Tinatin and Nestan-Darejan are constantly present in thoughts of the knights and serve to give the narrative tension as a whole. Princesses, higher in social rank than their servant knights, are inspired by the Queen Tamar or reflect the fact that each of them is the sovereign in their own realm. Tinatin chooses her own husband which references Queen Tamar (who also chose her second husband) as her role as the sovereign. and her father Rostevan, ceding his throne to his daughter references King George III of Georgia who was succeeded by his daughter in 1178, after his death.

Tinatin is a static character who leaves no time to the court of her father in Arabia. Nestan, a prisoner in distant regions, is also passive. But their confidence, righteousness, shows these two women being faithful and respective lovers. As for Patman, she is an altered representation of their type but an adulteress during the absence of her husband. Patman takes little account of family honor as she humiliates her husband on account of his bodily defects. Her character is true to life from the artistic point of view. Despite everything, she is capable of displaying both affection and sincere warmth peculiar to a woman. She spares no effort to save Nestan. It is very characteristic that when Patman learns of the purpose of Avtandil's journey, she makes no attempt to keep the man she loves at her side even for a short time.

== Human relationships ==
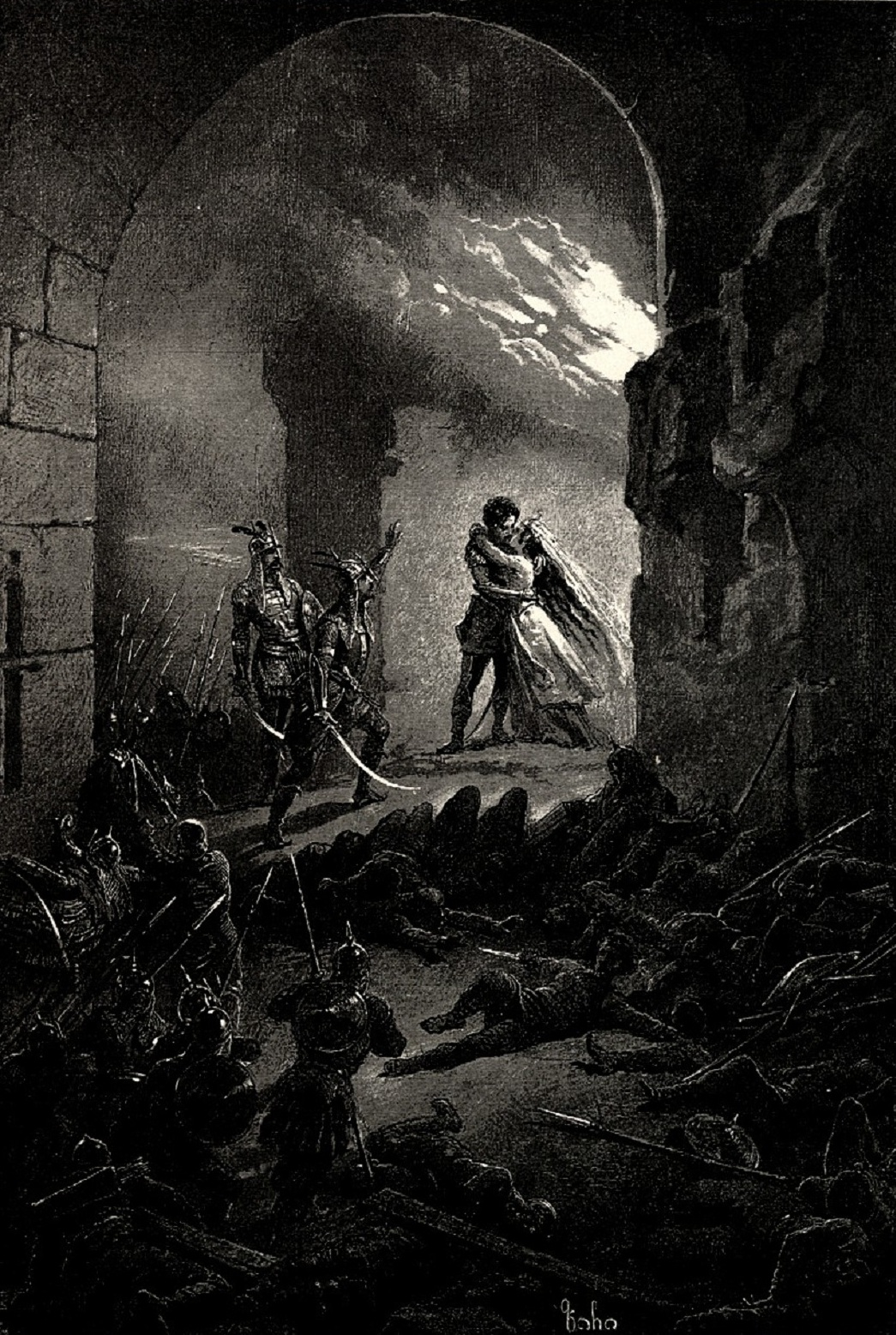
Attack against the Kajs and reunion of Tariel and Nestan-Darejan, Mihály Zichy illustration.

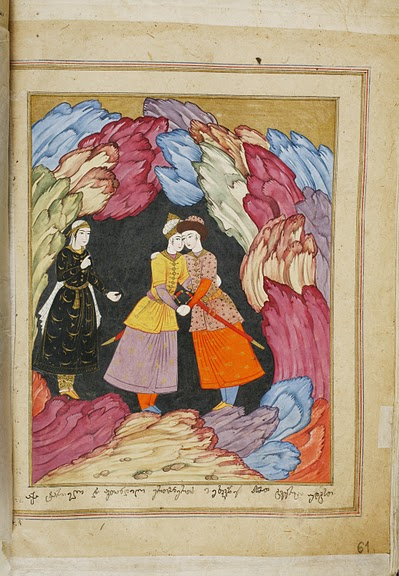
Avtandil and Tariel in cave with Asmat.

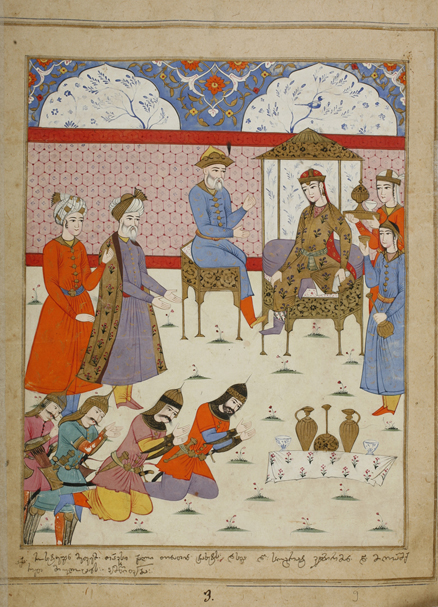
Coronation of Tinatin.

Rustaveli is a great humanist. The poet focuses his attention on a man as a complex of sincere feelings, emotions, passions and aspirations. To counterbalance the mentality of the Middle Ages and the ecclesiastic morality of asceticism, Rustaveli proclaims the freedom of man as a personality, free of thought and feeling.

=== Love ===
In the prologue, Rustaveli describes three types of love: inaccessible, heavenly love; physical love; and finally, a higher earthly love, or passionate love. Rustaveli thinks that pure and constant love does not expect love in return. Such love can not be felt without a strong spirit; he suggests that the only possibility of enjoying love of this order is to have the natural qualities of a true human being. The valiant must win his beauty by impeccable behavior, including a constant devotion, the rejection of social duties, and selfless loyalty. And as the author says, "love is a severe trial for man as for woman".

Nestan's loyalty is expressed in the dramatic tension well before the appearance of her character; She is a model of righteousness. When it was announced that Nestan would be married against her will, she protests with force, and supports the consequences by her heroic courage and stoicism. For the three heroes who go to her aid, fearless and selfless, their fight is intended as a quest for justice. Amorous conquest is noticeably absent from the poem. Both romantic relationships are paralleled and never mixed, as the true brotherhood between the two heroes prevent such incidents. Love, like friendship, often gives rise to hyperbolic descriptions in the poem.

=== Friendship ===
The friendship between the three heroes sworn, Avtandil, Tariel and Pridon, a clear narrative of the entire epic, binds them together and at the same time it binds their peoples. These three men belong to different nations, they find themselves with the same aspirations and the same goal and that is their union of forces that can and will destroy a tyranny and evil what is represented by the Kajs. This friendship, full of honesty and courage, free of cowardice and sycophancy, must go to the death if necessary. Such friendship is also possible between persons of different sexes in this case of Tariel and Asmat who share the same cave in brotherhood. However, love and friendship are intertwined as love of a knight with his heroism is fully realized with the help of a disinterested friendship and absolute loyalty. Both feelings are also expressed in the terms when Avtandil even against the will and order of his king departs to help his friend in need. Moreover, the happiness of each is conditioned by the happiness of others. Tinatin allows Avtandil to leave for Tariel, because it is the duty of her suitor to rescue his friend to whom he has promised to help.

== Morals, religion and philosophy ==
=== Values ===
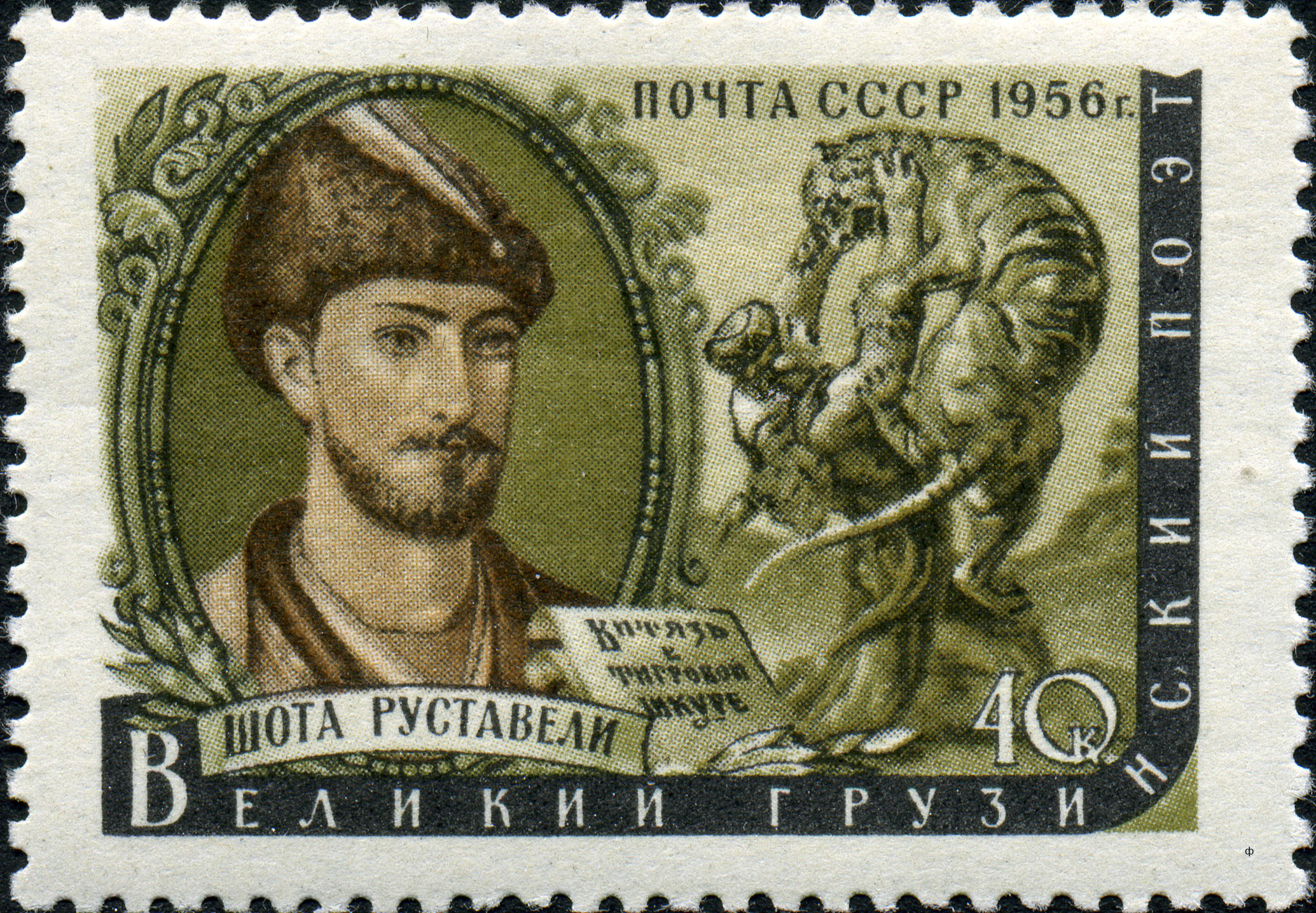
Rustaveli and The Knight in the Panther's Skin depicted on a 1956 USSR stamp

The glorification of courtly love leads Rustaveli to strongly condemn forced marriages. The poem also shows an admiration for the woman and demands for gender equality. Even though Queen Tamar is the first female monarch and the sovereign of the kingdom, women's political function, position and leading role in Georgia was very high be it the patronage of Georgia by the Virgin Mary or conversion of Georgians to Christianity by a woman, Saint Nino in the 4th century. This "cult of woman" celebrates her honor and freedom to choose her own husband and Nestan is the model of a noble woman who puts reason above passion. In equal rights, women can develop a sincere friendship with the opposite sex without love and desire and Asmat is dedicated to Tariel. Slavery is also condemned in the poem.

Politically, the poem does not lack and is not without patriotism. The state must be led by a strong and autocratic central government, however, sovereigns must rule with justice and prudence.

In general, the poem is a "manifest of living with joy". The success of the three heroes in the liberation of Nestan shows that justice can exist on earth, as with enough courage and perseverance, one can find the happiness here.

=== Religious and philosophical views ===
The 17th-century manuscript of the poem

The poem sometimes gives the impression of being a pagan work. In fact, there are no prayers in the poem, and no references to Christ, the Virgin Mary, or the Trinity. However, Paul the Apostle is mentioned, and there are a number of references to the Gospels and the Old Testament, including ten occurrences of the Garden of Eden, as well as references to the Euphrates, Gibeon and Levi).

Nevertheless, the moral framework of the work is Christian, with a clear dichotomy between a good god and a hard and disappointing world. This Christianity is not, however, fanatical. Rustaveli refers to the Quran multiple times to indicate that most of the characters are Muslim. He never offends Islam in his work and uses it as an allegory for Christianity, since most of the values that the poem promotes are of Christian origin. He also mentions the twelve apostles (verse 799) and how they spread the philosophy of benevolence and love.

There are philosophical references in the poem to the work of Pseudo-Dionysius (verse 1478) which may be attributed to the influence of the Georgian monk Peter the Iberian, an idealist, who believed in the oneness of God but sees the impossibility of knowing God's real existence. Rustaveli's presentation of God as a universal force rather than only a Christian one once led to the suppression of the poem. Believing Rustaveli was a Muslim (an opinion also proffered by Nicholas Marr in 1917), the Georgian Orthodox Church in the past systematically destroyed copies of the poem.

== Translations ==
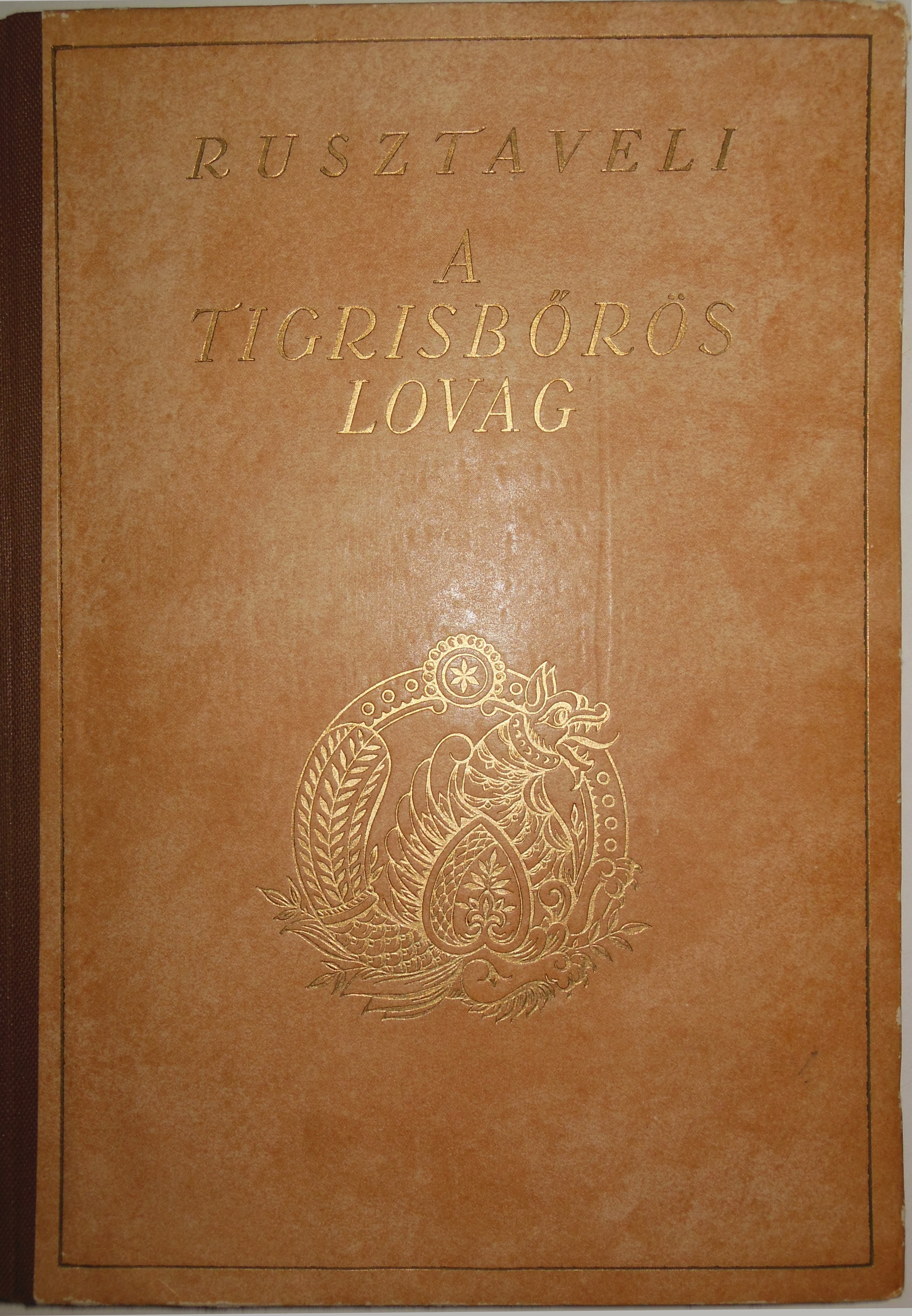
Cover of The Knight in the Panthher's Skin's 1954 Hungarian edition

Within Georgia, the poem has been translated into other Kartvelian languages like Laz, Svan and Mingrelian.

Outside of Georgia, interest in the poem first appeared in 1802, when Eugene Bolkhovitinov published a verbatim translation of the first stanza of the poem into Russian. In France in 1828, Marie-Félicité Brosset made his first partial French translation. In the 19th century the poem saw full translations into Polish, German and Russian. In 1845, extracts were published in Russian, French and Armenian. In the late 19th century, Arthur and Bertha von Suttner collaborated to bring the poem to a wider European audience.

Vahan Terian, a prominent Georgian-born Armenian poet, translated the prelude, which was first published posthumously in 1922. It was praised by Nicholas Marr. In 1912, Marjory Wardrop published the first English translation available. In 1968, a verse translation by Venera Urushadze was published in Georgia. It was also translated into modern Azerbaijani in 1978 by Dilara Aliyeva. In 2015, an English poetic translation by Lyn Coffin was published, combining literary achievement with academic precision.

Today, unabridged editions are available in many languages: Abkhaz, Armenian, Azerbaijani, Bashkir, Belarusian, Bulgarian, Chechen, Chinese, Chuvash, Czech, Esperanto, Greek, Hebrew, Hindi, Hungarian, Italian, Japanese, Kazakh, Korean, Kurdish, Kyrgyz, Moldovan, Mongolian, Ossetian, Persian, Romanian, Serbian, Slovak, Spanish, Tatar, Turkmen, Ukrainian, and Uzbek.

Among the translations, the 1989 Esperanto version by Zurab Makaŝvili and the 2015 English version by Lyn Coffin are notable not only for faithfully reproducing the content of the poem, but also for preserving the poetic structure of the epic in shairi (rhymed stanzas of four sixteen-syllable lines).

In 2025, Thea Gomelauri translated The Knight in the Panther's Skin as "Dressed in a Tiger's Fur".

To celebrate the 65th Anniversary of the Recovery of Shota Rustaveli's Fresco, Oxford Interfaith Forum organised a series of educational events, including a multi-lingual conference "Rustaveli's Gift to Humanity".

== See also ==
- Amiran-Darejaniani, a 12th-century Georgian chivalric romance
- Rostam
- List of epic poems

== Sources ==
- Thea Gomelauri (June 16, 2025). Article: 65 Years since the Recovery of Shota Rustaveli's Fresco: The Gift of 'Dressed in a Tiger's Fur' to the World. Oxford Interfaith Forum. Retrieved August 10, 2025 from https://oxfordinterfaithforum.org/blog/the-65th-anniversary-of-the-recovery-of-the-iconic-interculturalist-poet-shota-rustavelis-medieval-fresco/
- Nodar Asatiani & Alexandre Bendianashvili, Histoire de la Géorgie, Paris, l'Harmattan, 1997
- A. G. Baramidze & D. M. Gamezardashvili, Georgian Literature, Honolulu, University Press of the Pacific, 2001 (1st ed. 1968)
- Gijs Koolemans Beynen, "Adultery and Death in Shota Rustaveli's The Man in the Panther Skin", Courtly Arts and the Arts of Courtliness, 2004
- Gould, Rebecca Ruth (2018). "Sweetening the Heavy Georgian Tongue: Jāmī in the Georgian-Persianate World". In d'Hubert, Thibaut; Papas, Alexandre (eds.). Jāmī in Regional Contexts: The Reception of ʿAbd al-Raḥmān Jāmī's Works in the Islamicate World, ca. 9th/15th-14th/20th Century. Brill. ISBN 978-9004386600.
- Green, Nile (2019). "Introduction: The Frontiers of the Persianate World (ca. 800–1900)". In Green, Nile (ed.). The Persianate World: The Frontiers of a Eurasian Lingua Franca. University of California Press. ISBN 978-0520972100.
- Farshid Delshad, Studien zu den iranischen und semitischen Lehnwörtern im georgischen Nationalepos "Der Recke im Pantherfell", Iéna, 2002
- A. Khakhanoff, Abrégé de l'histoire et de la littérature géorgienne, dans Raphaël Isarloff, Histoire de Géorgie, Paris - Tbilissi, Charles Noblet - Librairie de la société géorgienne de lettres, 1900
- M. Kveselava, Anthology of Georgian Poetry, Honolulu, University Press of the Pacific, 2001 (1st ed. 1948)
- Jean-Claude Polet, Patrimoine littéraire européen, vol. 4a, Le Moyen Âge, de l'Oural à l'Atlantique. Littératures d'Europe orientale, De Boeck, 1993
- Donald Rayfield, The Literature of Georgia, Richmond, Curzon Press, 2000 (1st ed. 1994)
- Rapp, Stephen H. (2017). "Georgia before the Mongols". Georgia before the Mongols. Oxford Research Encyclopedia of Asian History. doi:10.1093/acrefore/9780190277727.013.282. ISBN 9780190277727.
- Shota Rustaveli The Knight in the Panther Skin, new translation by Lyn Coffin. Poezia Press, 2015 Tbilisi, Georgia
- Kakha Shengelia, History of Georgia, Tbilisi, Caucasus University Publishing House, 2001
- Marjory Scott Wardrop, The Man in the Panther's Skin: A Romantic Epic by Shota Rustaveli, Royal Asiatic Society, 1912 The full text of The Man in the Panther's Skin at Wikisource The Man in the Panther's Skin public domain audiobook at LibriVox
- Beynen, G. Koolemans. "Murder, Foul and Fair, in Shota Rustaveli's The Man in the Panther Skin", in Medieval and Early Modern Murder, Larissa Tracy, ed. (Woodbridge: The Boydell Press, 2018), pp. 350-70.
