= Navid Faridi =

Iranian footballer and coach

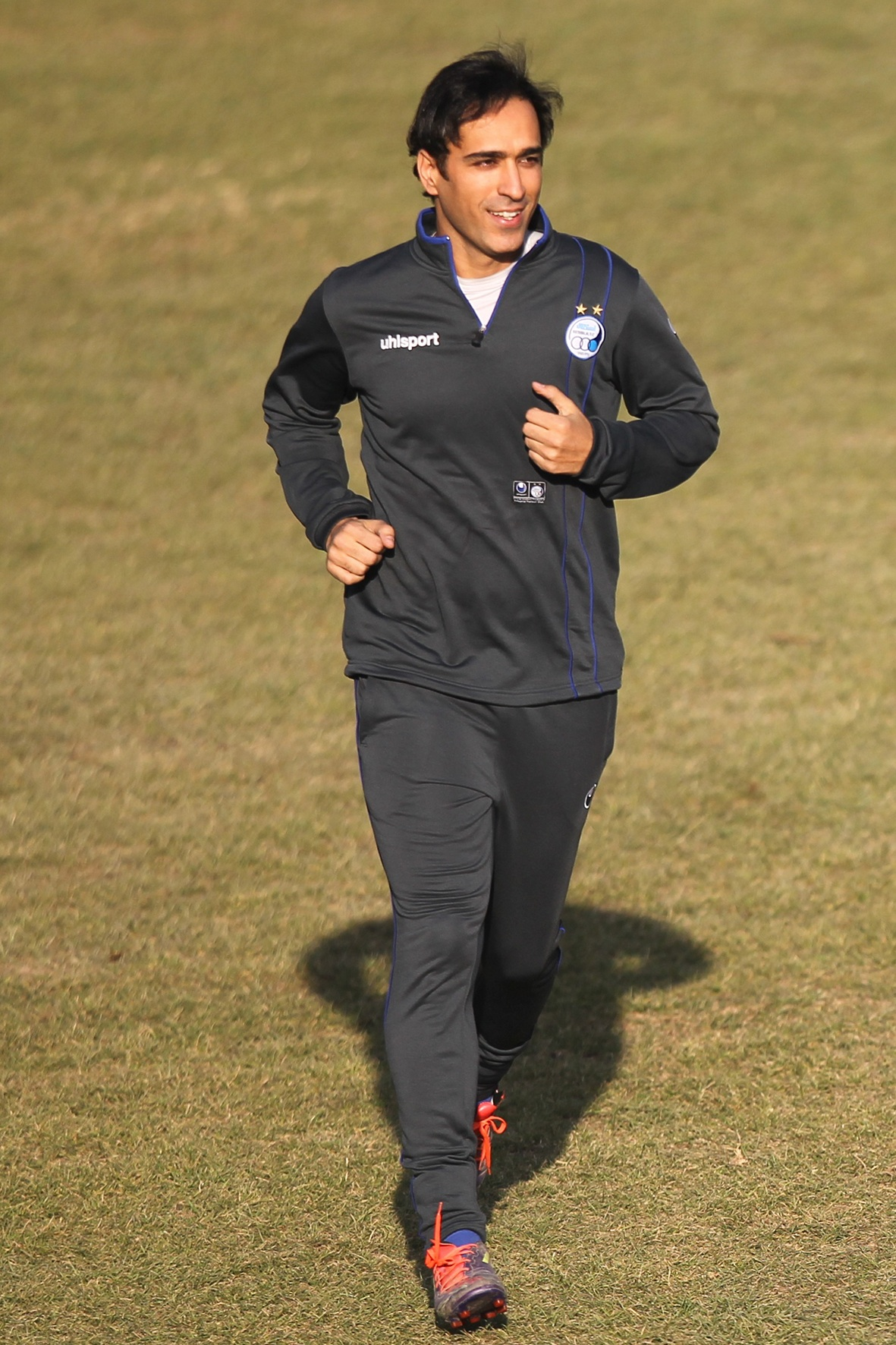

Personal information
- Full name: Navid Faridi
- Date of birth: 14 July 1977 (age 49)
- Place of birth: Shiraz, Iran
- Height: 1.87 m (6 ft 1 1/2 in)
- Position: Midfielder

Senior career*
Years	Team	Apps	(Gls)
1991-1992	Payam Tehran F.C.		
1992–1994	Saipa		
1994–1996	Etka Tehran F.C.		
1999-2000	Bank Tejarat F.C.		
2001-2004	Esteghlal F.C. kish		
2005-2006	Shensa F.C		
2008-2009	Maharat Semnan F.C		
2009-2011	Masafi Club, U.A.E.		

Managerial career
- 2014-2017: Esteghlal F.C. (U19)
- 2017: Damash Tehran
- 2017-2018: Esteghlal F.C.
- 2018-2019: Esteghlal F.C. (U'19)
- 2019: Al-Najma Al-Zarqaa Football Academy
- * Club domestic league appearances and goals

Navid Faridi (Persian: نويد فريدى, born 14 July 1977) is an Iranian former footballer and current coach. He was previous manager of Esteghlal F.C. U-19 in Iran Pro League until 2020 and recently he is the founder and current manager of Al-Najma Al-Zarqaa Football Academy in the United Arab Emirates.

== Playing career ==
He started his playing career with Payam Tehran, continued with Saipa, and joined Esteghlal later, when Amir Ghalenoei was the team manager. He ended his playing career with Masafi Club in the UAE.

== Managerial career ==
Navid started his managerial career with Esteghlal Alborz in 2014, and became coach of Damash Tehran in 2017. He joined Esteghlal Team U-15 for season 2017-2018 and U-19 team for 2018–2019. He was coach of Esteghlal F.C. U-16 with Alireza Akbarpour in Esteghlal F.C.Academy for season 2018-2019 and recently is founder and current manager of Al-Najma Al-Zarqaa Football Academy in Dubai, UAE.
