= Mihály Zichy =

Hungarian painter (1827–1906)

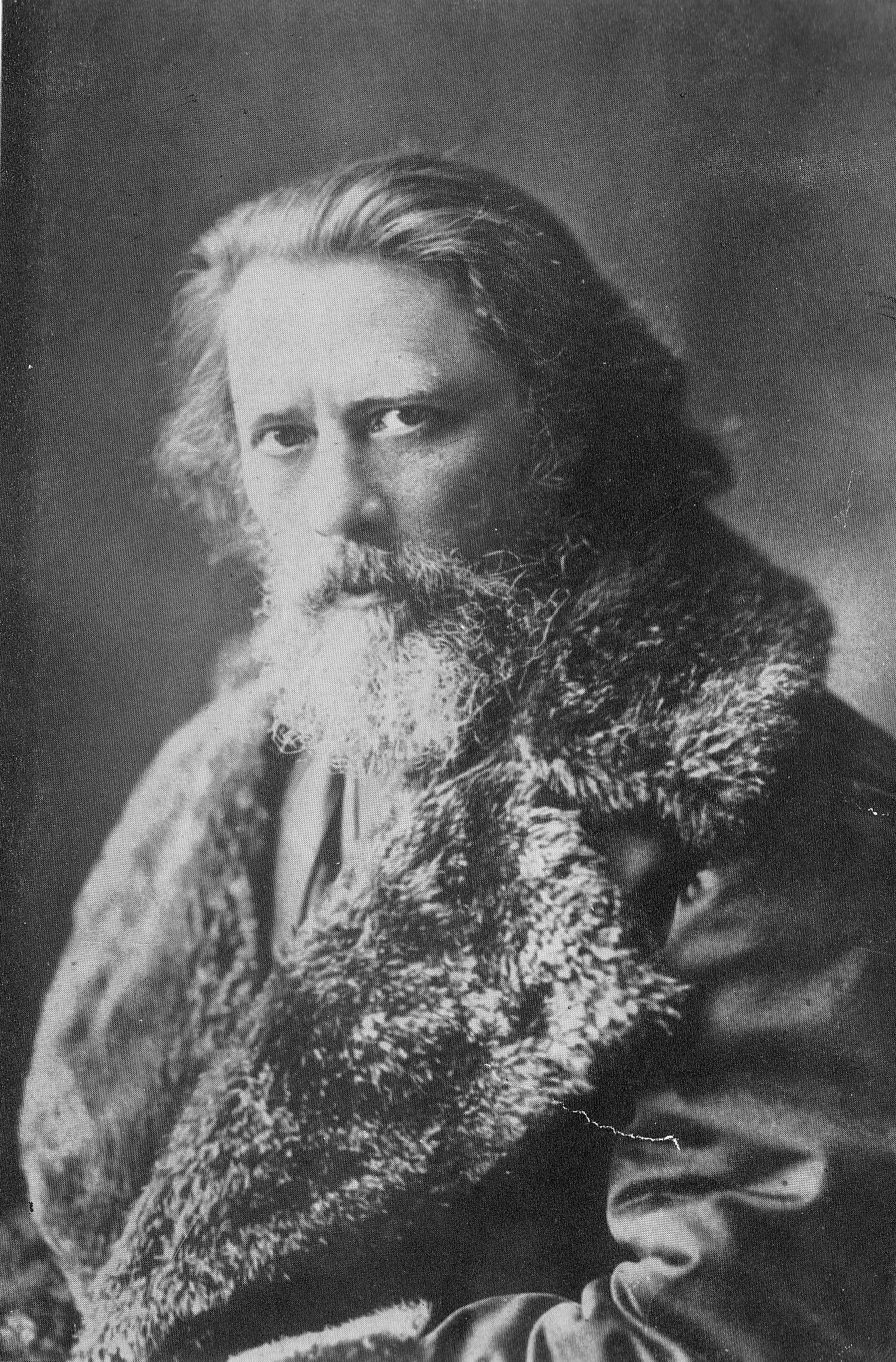
- Zichy in 1881
- Born: 15 October 1827; Zala, Hungary
- Died: 28 February 1906 (aged 78); Saint Petersburg, Russia

Mihály Zichy (Hungarian pronunciation: [ˈmihaːj ˈzit͡ʃi]; German: Michael von Zichy; 15 October 1827 – 28 February 1906) was a Hungarian painter and draughtsman. He is considered a notable representative of Hungarian romantic painting. He lived and worked primarily in Saint Petersburg and Paris during his career.

He is known for illustrating the Georgian epic poem The Knight in the Panther's Skin on an 1881 commission by the intelligentsia. By the time he had completed 35 pictures, he was so moved by the poem that he gave his works to the Georgian people as a gift.

== Biography ==
During his law studies in Pest from 1842, Zichy attended Jakab Marastoni's art school as well. He went to Vienna to study under Ferdinand Georg Waldmüller in 1844. Lifeboat, his first major work, was painted during this period.

On Waldmüller's recommendation, Zichy was hired as an art teacher in Saint Petersburg. He swore allegiance to freedom in 1849 by painting the portrait of Lajos Batthyány, the first Hungarian prime minister. From 1850 onwards, he worked primarily as a retoucher. He also made pencil drawings, water colours, and portraits in oil.

His erotic drawings are noted for having a warm intensity, as both members of the couple seem equal partners. The series on the Gatchina hunting, ordered by the Russian tsar, gained Zichy standing as a court artist. He founded a society to support painters in need. He painted Autodafé (1868) to express the horrors of the Spanish Inquisition in earlier centuries. In 1871 he travelled through Europe, settling in Paris in 1874.

He painted Queen Elisabeth Laying Flowers by the Coffin of Ferenc Deák as a commission from Treffort. Drinking Bout of Henry III his next large-scale picture, came in 1875. The Victory of the Genius of Destruction, painted for the Paris Exhibition, was banned by French authorities because of its daring antimilitarist message.

Zichy left Paris in 1881 and returned to Saint Petersburg, after short stays in Nice, Vienna and his native Zala.

That year he also visited Tbilisi, Caucasus Viceroyalty (today Georgia). He was commissioned to illustrate the Georgian epic poem, The Knight in the Panther's Skin, at the request of intelligentsia of the country. He painted 35 pictures in total. The publishing commission of the work of The Knight in the Panther's Skin chose 27 pictures to be included in the publication. The painter refused to take payment for the works, because he was so moved by the original poem. Instead, he gave his works to the Georgian people.

From this time onward, Zichy mostly engaged in illustration work. Examples of works he illustrated include The Tragedy of Man by Imre Madách, in 1887, and twenty-four ballads of János Arany, 1894–98.

== Selected works ==
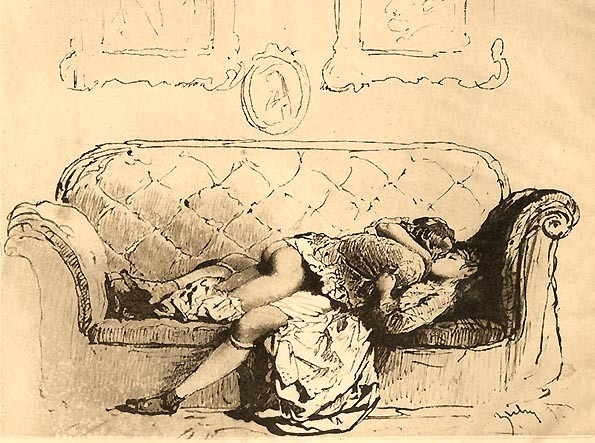
"Lovers Embrace", in ink by Mihály Zichy

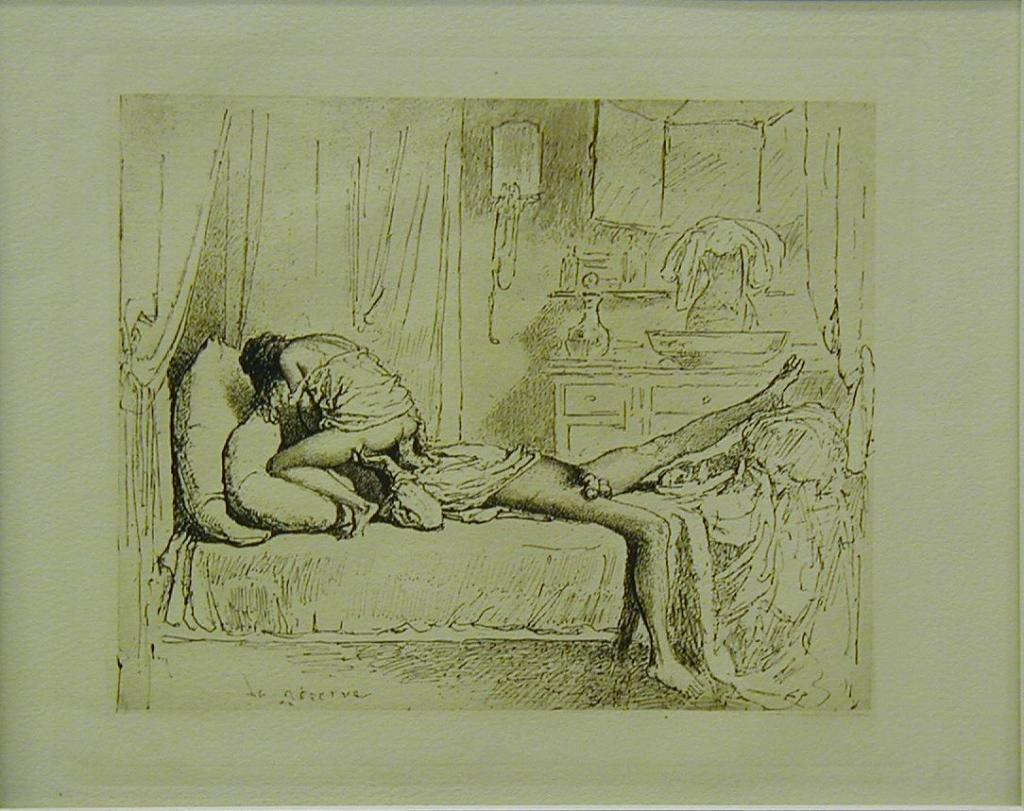
"Making love" (1911)

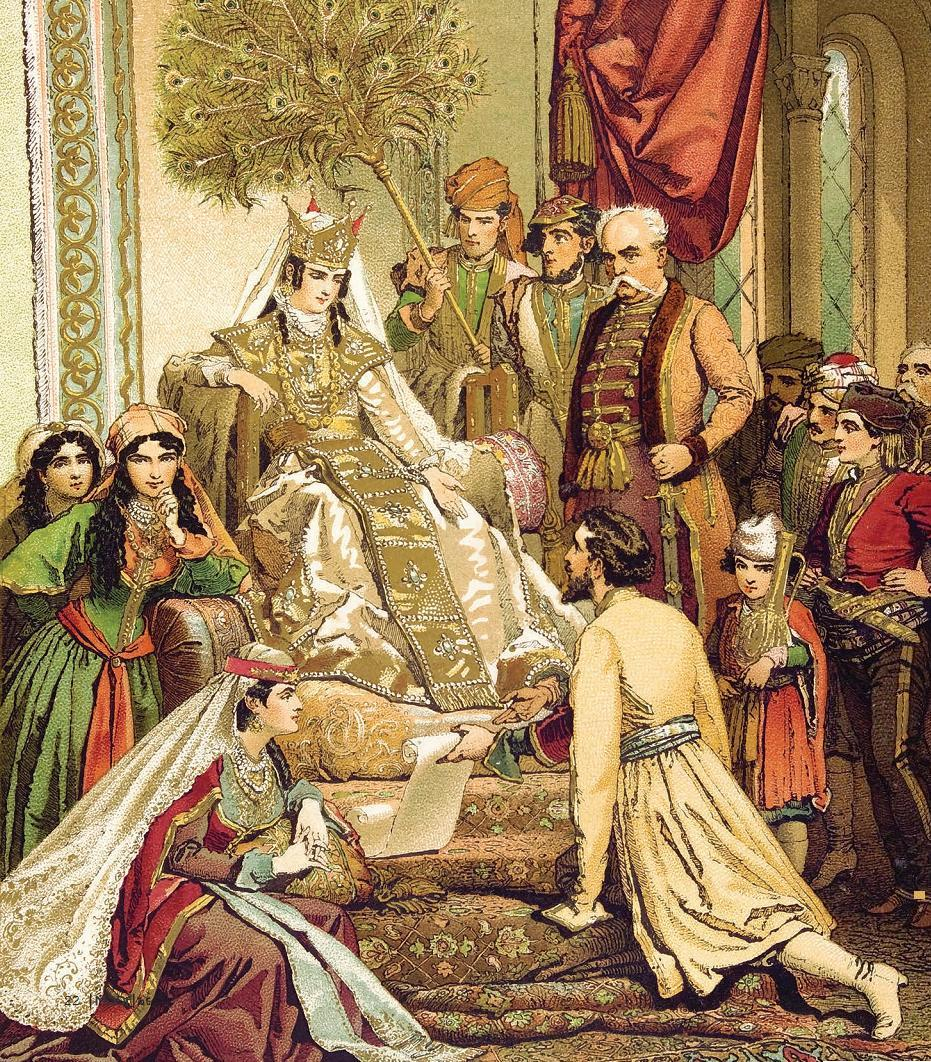
Shota Rustaveli presents his epic poem to Queen Tamar, 1880s

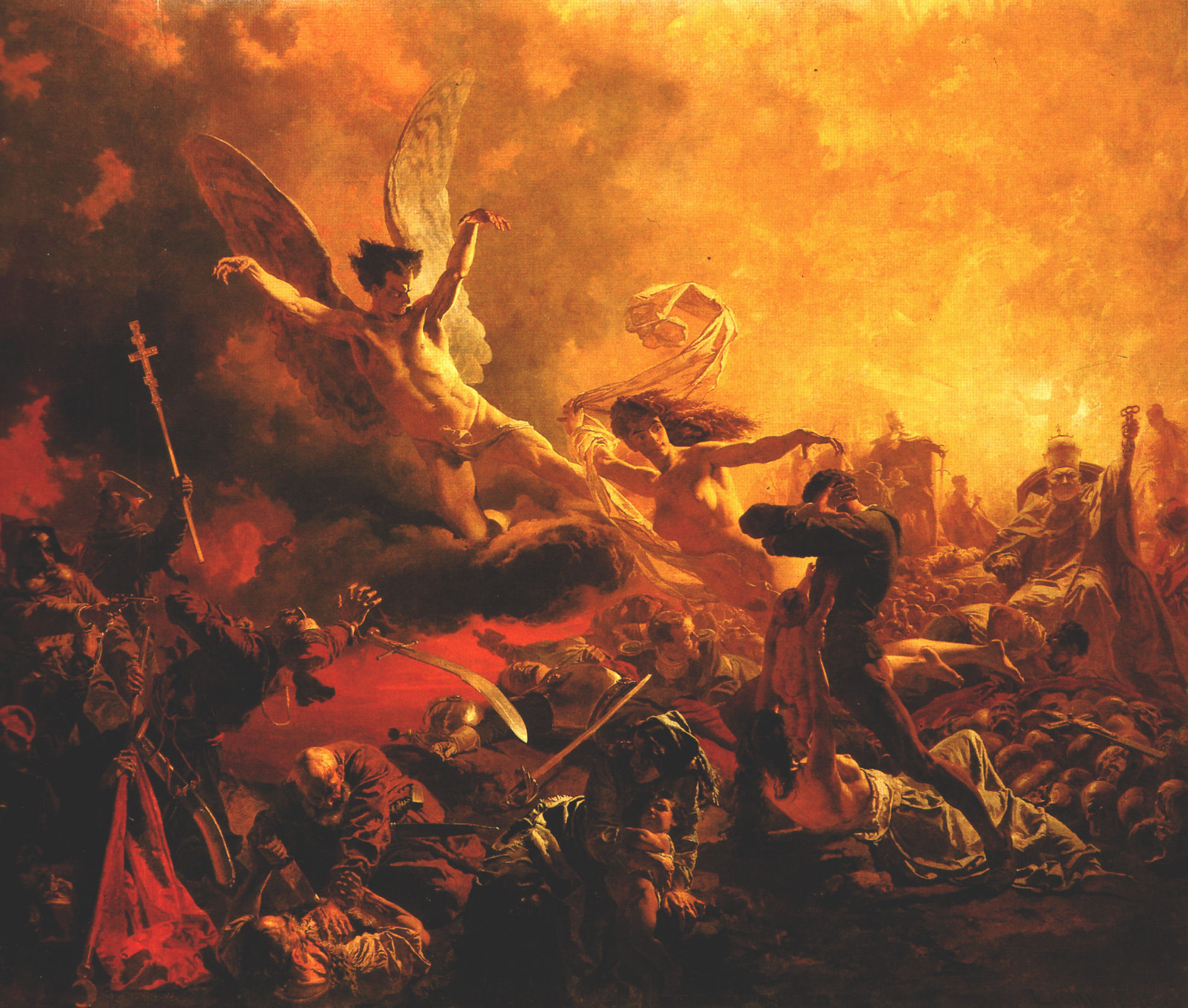
The Triumph of the Genius of Destruction

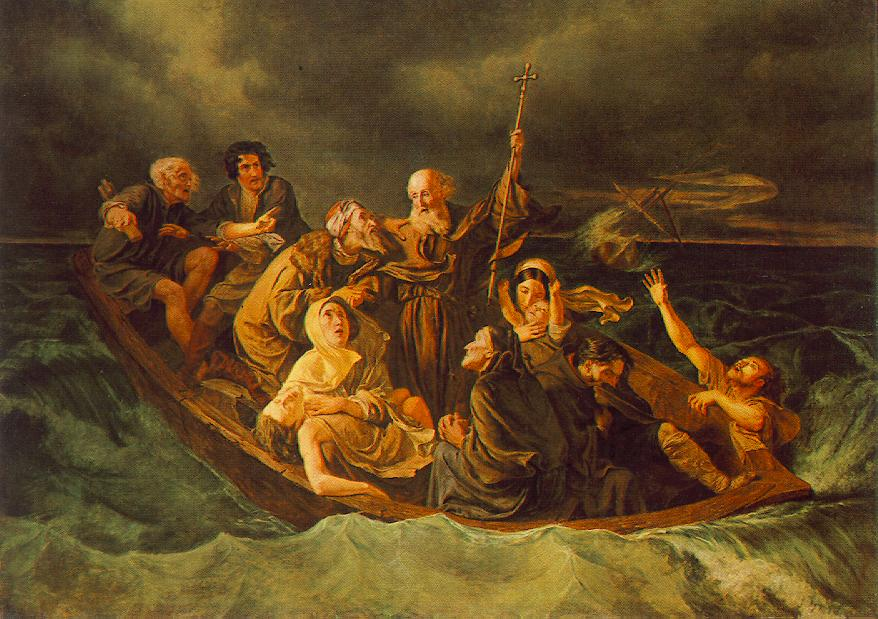
Lifeboat
