= Farshad Majedi =

Iranian footballer

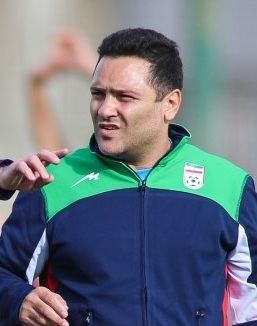

Personal information
- Full name: Farshad Majedi
- Date of birth: March 11, 1979 (age 47)
- Place of birth: Tehran, Iran
- Height: 1.70 m (5 ft 7 in)
- Position: Striker

Team information
- Current team: Esteghlal (assistant)

Senior career*
Years	Team	Apps	(Gls)
- Pas Tehran

Managerial career
- 2010–2014: Payam Tehran (youth)
- 2014–2016: Iran U16 (assistant)
- 2017–2018: Iran U14 (assistant)
- 2018–2019: Iran U23 (assistant)
- 2019: Esteghlal (assistant)
- 2019: Iran U23 (assistant)
- 2021–: Esteghlal (assistant)
- * Club domestic league appearances and goals

Farshad Majedi (Persian: فرشاد ماجدى, born 11 March 1979) is a former Iranian footballer, and Mirshad Majedi′s younger brother. He played in Payam Tehran F.C., Pas F.C., Maharat Semnan and Iran national football team in youth level.

== Management career ==
He started his coaching career with Payam Tehran F.C. for four years and joined Iran national football team youth level later. He continued with Iran national under-23 football team

== Playing career ==
- Payam (Youth)
- Tejarat (Youth)
- Keshavarz (Youth)
- Pas Tehran (for 5 Years)
- TOT Thailand

== Retirement ==
Farshad Majedi could not play football after a traumatic brain injury (TBI) and started to participate in coaching courses
