= Middle Georgian =

Literary language of 12th to 18th-century Georgia

- sashuali kartuli
- საშუალი ქართული
- The Knight in the Panther's Skin, Middle Georgian literature
- Native to: Kingdom of Georgia, Kingdom of Western Georgia, Kingdom of Eastern Georgia, Samtskhe-Saatabago, Kingdom of Kartli, Kingdom of Kakheti, Kingdom of Imereti
- Region: Caucasus
- Ethnicity: Georgians
- Era: 12th to 18th centuries
- Language family: Kartvelian: Old Georgian; Middle Georgian
- Writing system: Georgian scripts

Language codes
- ISO 639-3: MidGeo

Middle Georgian (საშუალი ქართული, sashuali kartuli) was a literary language of the Georgian monarchies from the 12th century till 18th century, succeeding Old Georgian and developing into Modern Georgian. (Note: The prominent Georgian linguists, Arnold Chikobava and Giorgi Gogolashvili, did not agree and approve of the 3-stage periodization of Georgian (Old Georgian, Middle Georgian and Modern Georgian). They maintained that only 2-stage periodization for the language should be distinguished, that is of Old Georgian, from 5th to 11th centuries, and Modern Georgian, since the 12th century. Chikobava argued that Middle Georgian lacked independence concerning its grammatical word order and lexical corpus. Gogolashvili argued that Middle Georgian as a literary language does not exist, claiming that there is almost no linguistic fact or a phenomenon that is different from both Old and Modern Georgian.) It is described as a transitional stage with an intrinsic structure for the Modern Georgian, that on a syntactic-typological level uses mixed features derived from Old Georgian. Middle Georgian was marked by greater genre-specific differences between epic, poetic and hagiographic, documentary texts, with degree of grammatical conservativeness.

== Periodization ==
Middle Georgian periodization is linked with the literary textual production in terms of genres. Old Georgian literature contained mostly the ecclesiastical writings, created or influenced by the foreign translations. From the 11th-12 centuries, the diversity of the written literature in terms of genre and content sees a major moment of expansion. If the 11th century was the start of major translations of foreign philosophical works, the 12th century marked the moment of creation of non-ecclesiastical, secular literature. One of the main landmarks for this transition and emergence of Middle Georgian was an epic poetry of Shota Rustaveli, The Knight in the Panther's Skin.

== Noun phrase ==
The noun phrase of Middle Georgian are similar to both, Old Georgian and Modern Georgian. The demonstratives in Middle Georgian show the same 3-way deictic differentiation; the forms, however are doubled.

ese (Note: The declension of a word ეს(ე) (this).) sg.	es sg.	es(e) pl.
nom. ese erg. aman dat. amas gen. amis-(a) inst. amit-(a) adv. am-ad	nom. es erg. / dat. / gen. / inst. / adv. am	nom. ese-n-i erg. / dat. / gen. ama-t adv. ama-t-a

In Old Georgian, the oblique case forms generally appear without an initial i (man, mas, mis(a), mit(a), mad), whereas they appear frequently with initial i in Middle Georgian (iman, imas, imis(a), imit(a), imad), thus representing a clear linguistic characteristic trait of Middle Georgian.

== Indefinite pronouns ==
The most significant change of indefinite pronouns in Middle Georgian are observed in the declension of non-human interrogative pronoun ra, (what).

nom. rame erg. rame-m dat. rame-s(a) gen. ram-is(a) inst. ram-it(a) adv. rame-d

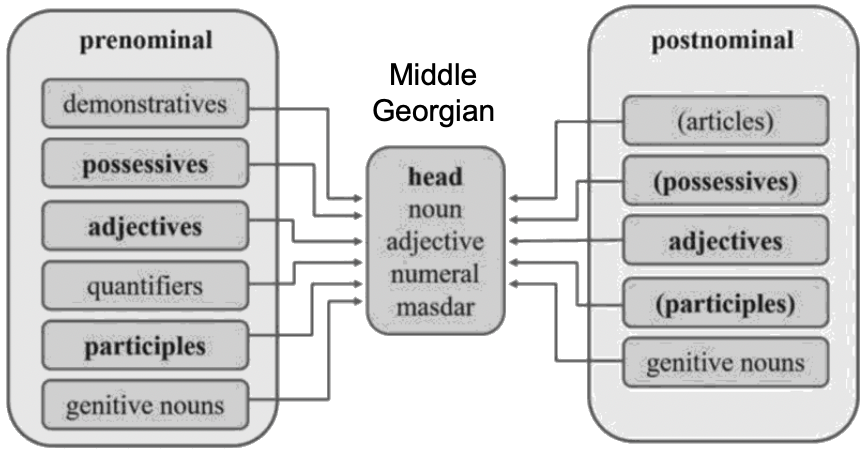

The postnominal placement of indefinite pronouns is more dominant in Middle Georgian than the prenominal placement in Old Georgian. In contrast to Old Georgian, almost all determiners and modifiers of Middle Georgian move to the prenominal domain, while some of them still maintained the postnominal position.

am-is shavshet-is-a ghado-ta shina gamochnda vin-me kats-i aspaanis-dze (Note: From the "Life of King of Kings Tamar" of The Georgian Chronicles, line 127:23)
this (gen. sg.) Shavsheti (gen. sg.) mountain (gen. pl.) in appear someone (nom. sg.) man (nom. sg.) son of Aspaani

== Bibliography ==
- Kamarauli, Mariam (2022) The Nominal Domain in Georgian: A diachronic analysis, Volume 5 of Folia Caucasica, Ludwig Reichert Verlag, ISBN 978-3-7520-0117-4
- Gippert, Jost & Gehrke, Ralf (2015) Historical Corpora, Narr, ISBN 978-3-8233-6922-6
