= Farshad Ebrahimpour Nourabadi =

Iranian politician

List of Iran's parliament representatives (12th term); Islamic Consultative Assembly
- Preceded by: Abdollah Izadpanah
- Majority: 50,584

Personal details
- Born: September 22, 1977 (age 48) Izeh, Khouzestan, Iran
- Education: PhD in Agriculture
- Website: https://drfebrahimpour.ir/

Farshad Ebrahimpour Nourabadi (born September 22, 1977) is an Iranian politician and a representative in the 12th term of the Islamic Consultative Assembly (Parliament) from the electoral district of Izeh, Bagh-e Malek, Dezpart County, and Seydoun.

== Education, Research and Technology Commission of the Islamic Consultative Assembly ==
Following the election of the board members of the Education, Research, and Technology Committee, Nourabadi was elected as the Vice Chairman of this committee.

== List of Iran's parliament representatives (12th term) ==
The Governor of Izeh stated that Nourabadi was elected as the representative of the people of Izeh, Baghmalek, Dezpart, and Seydun in the 12th parliamentary elections of the Islamic Consultative Assembly with 50,383 votes.

== Executive background ==
Former Deputy Minister of Education, Director of Payame Noor University in Tehran and Khuzestan Provinces, Head of the Secretariat of the Board of Trustees of the Agricultural Research, Education, and Extension Organization at the Ministry of Agriculture Jihad.

== See also ==
- List of Iran's parliament representatives (12th term)
