= Artimes Farshad Yeganeh =

Iranian rock climber (born 1981)

Artimes FarshadYeganeh آرتیمس فرشاد یگانه
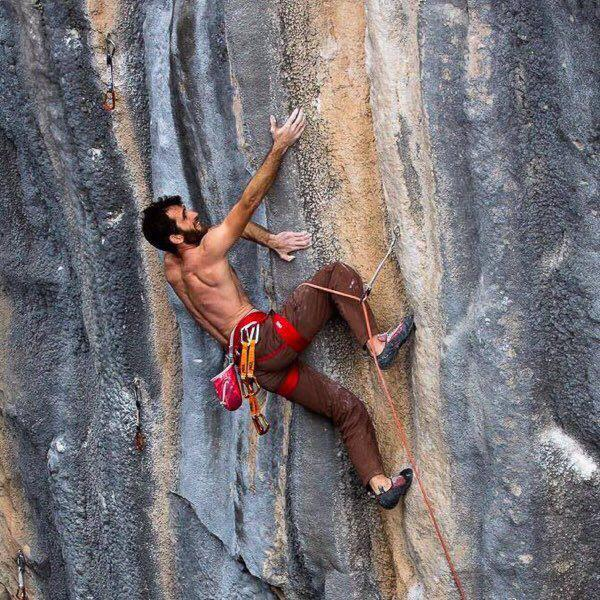

Personal information
- Born: May 27, 1981 (age 45) Tehran, Iran
- Education: Bachelor of Physical Education/Master Degree in Physical Education Management
- Occupations: Rock climber, Head Coach of Iranian climbing Team for 9 years, Asian Chief Route Setter and IFSC Chief route setter
- Height: 177 cm (5 ft 10 in)
- Weight: 61 kg (134 lb)

Climbing career
- Type of climber: Competition climbing; Sport climbing; Bouldering
- Highest grade: Redpoint: 8b+/8c; Onsight/Flash: 8a+ (5.13c); Bouldering: 8B (V13)
Medal record
National Championships
Gold medal – first place	2006	Lead
Bronze medal – third place	2002	Lead
Groups Cup
Silver medal – second place	2000	National Competition
Fajr Championships
Silver medal – second place	2006	National Competition
Bronze medal – third place	2002	International Competition
Bronze medal – third place	1998	National Competition
Tehran Province Championships
Gold medal – first place	2001	Lead
Gold medal – first place	2002	Lead
Gold medal – first place	2003	Lead
Gold medal – first place	2004	Lead
Gold medal – first place	2006	Lead
Gold medal – first place	2007	Lead
Gold medal – first place	2008	Lead
Gold medal – first place	2009	Lead
Silver medal – second place	2005	Lead
Silver medal – second place	2010	Lead
Silver medal – second place	2012	Lead
Silver medal – second place	2013	Lead
Silver medal – second place	2013	Bouldering
Bronze medal – third place	2014	Lead
Gold medal – first place	2021	Lead
Tehran Province League
Gold medal – first place	2010	Lead
Gold medal – first place	2011	Lead
- Updated on 11 Dec 2014

Artimes Farshad Yeganeh (Persian: آرتیمس فرشاد یگانه, born 27 May 1981 in Tehran, Iran) is an Iranian rock climber who has specialized in both competition climbing (lead and bouldering), and outdoor sport climbing and bouldering. He has been climbing for 30 years as a professional climber, a member of the Iranian National climbing team for many years, as a route setter in many national, continental, and world cups and championships, and Head Coach of the Iranian National climbing team for 6 years. He also participates in sport climbing and bouldering competitions and is one of the most famous Iranian climbers.

== Biography ==
Artimes was elected as one of the five members among competition climbing experts over Tehran province to make Tehran climbing league's statute. He later participated as a first Iranian Alpine Club's representative in bouldering world cup of 2009 in France. As he is mostly well known for lead climbing, he also solo climbed two routes. Currently, Artimes and Amin Abbasi are the only Iranian Continental route setters. He became IFSC JUNIOR Route setter in 2019 and Asian Chief Route Setter. He also became International Route Setter in 2020.He is only Iranian International Route Setter.

== Positions ==
Here are some positions he has held:

- 2007 – Tehran Mountaineering and Sport climbing–Educational Consultant
- 2008 – Tehran Mountaineering and Sport climbing–Educational Consultant
- 2009 – Tehran League founding member
- 2009 – Tehran Mountaineering and Sport climbing–Educational Consultant
- 2010 – Tehran Mountaineering and Sport climbing–Educational Consultant
- 2011 – Tehran Mountaineering and Sport climbing–Educational Consultant
- 2013 – Tehran Rebolting Committee
- 2014 – Iran Mountaineering and Sport Climbing Federation–Sport Climbing Committee–Route Setting Director
- 2014 – Iran Mountaineering and Sport Climbing Federation–Sport Climbing Committee–Route Setting Director
- 2015 – Iran Mountaineering and Sport Climbing Federation–Sport Climbing Committee–Route Setting Director
- 2015 – Iran Mountaineering and Sport Climbing Federation–National Team Committee–Head Coach of Youth Team
- 2016 – Iran Mountaineering and Sport Climbing Federation–National Team Committee–Head Coach of Youth Team
- 2016 – Iran Mountaineering and Sport Climbing Federation–Sport Climbing Committee–Route Setting Director
- 2017 — Member of Sport Department ACC of IFSC – Asian Continental Council
- 2017 – Iran Mountaineering and Sport Climbing Federation–Sport Climbing Committee–Route Setting Director
- 2017 – Iran Mountaineering and Sport Climbing Federation–National Team Committee–Head Coach of Youth Team
- 2018 – Iran Mountaineering and Sport Climbing Federation–Sport Climbing Committee–Route Setting Director
- 2018 – Iran Mountaineering and Sport Climbing Federation–Head Coach of Combined Team
- 2019 – Iran Mountaineering and Sport Climbing Federation–Sport Climbing Committee–Route Setting Director
- 2019 – Iran Mountaineering and Sport Climbing Federation–Head Coach of Combined Team
- 2020 – Iran Mountaineering and Sport Climbing Federation–Sport Climbing Committee–Route Setting Director
- 2020 — IFSC International Route Setter – International Sport Climbing Route Setter
- 2021 — Member of Route Setting Commission of IFSC – International Sport Climbing Federation
- 2021 — Member of Route Setting Commission of ACC of IFSC – Asian Continental Council
- 2021 — Chair of Coaching Commission Iran Mountaineering and Sport Climbing Federation
- 2023 - Head of Sport Climbing Department Iran Mountaineering and Sport Climbing Federation
- 2024 - Head of Sport Climbing Department Iran Mountaineering and Sport Climbing Federation
- 2025 - Head of Sport Climbing Department Iran Mountaineering and Sport Climbing Federation
- 2025— Member of Route Setting Commission of IFSC – International Sport Climbing Federation

== Coaching Certificate ==
=== Coaching certificates ===
- IRI Sport Climbing and Mountaineering Federation – Sport Climbing Coach Grade 1
- IRI Sport Climbing and Mountaineering Federation – Sport Climbing Coach Grade 2
- IRI Sport Climbing and Mountaineering Federation – Sport Climbing Coach Grade 3
- Rock Climbing Federation of Germany – Sport Climbing Coach Level 1, Level 2 and Level C1

=== Coaching experience ===
Gym	Time
Emam Ali University	2003-2006
Army	2005-2006
Davoudi	2005-2008
Tarbiat Modarres University Climbing Gym	2005-current
ArmenianClimbing Gym Sipan	2012-current
Payam Climbing Gym	2015-current
Raspina Welness Climbing Gym	2016-2018
MSFI Sport Climbing National Team Head Coach	2010-2019

== Route Setting certificates ==
- IRI Sport Climbing and Mountaineering Federation – Sport Climbing Route Setter Level 1
- IRI Sport Climbing and Mountaineering Federation – Sport Climbing Route Setter Level 2
- IRI Sport Climbing and Mountaineering Federation – National Sport Climbing Route Setter
- ACC of IFSC – Continental Sport Climbing Route Setter
- Member of Sport Department ACC of IFSC – Asian Continental Council 2017
- IFSC Junior – International Sport Climbing Route Setter
- IFSC International Route Setter – International Sport Climbing Route Setter
- Member of Route Setting Commission of IFSC – International Sport Climbing Federation 2021
- Member of Route Setting Commission of ACC of IFSC – Asian Continental Council 2021
- IFSC International Chief Route Setter – International Sport Climbing Route Setter 2023

== Route Setting Experiences ==
=== Route setting experiences ===
- 2005 - Chief Route Setter National Championships
- 2006 – Chief Route Setter–University Student National Championship
- 2007 – Chief Route Setter–Junior and Youth National Championship
- 2007 – Chief Route Setter–University Student National Championship
- 2009 – Chief Route Setter–National Championship
- 2011 – Route Setter–IFSC Master Cup International Cup
- 2013 – Route Setter– IFSC Asian Championships Tehran, Iran
- 2015 – Route Setter – IFSC Asian Youth Championship Malaysia
- 2016 – Route Setter – IFSC Asian Youth Championship Tehran, Iran
- 2016 – Route Setter – IFSC World Cup Munich, Germany
- 2017 – Route Setter – IFSC Asian Championship Tehran, Iran
- 2017 – Route Setter – IFSC Youth World Championship Innsbruck, Austria
- 2017 – Route Setter – IFSC Asian Cup Wanxianchan, China
- 2018 – Route Setter – IFSC FISU World University Championships Slovakia
- 2018 – Route Setter – 18th Asian Games Palembang, Indonesia
- 2018 – Chief Route Setter – IFSC Asian Championship Totori, Japan
- 2019 – Route Setter – IFSC World Cup bouldering Munich, Germany
- 2019 – Route Setter – IFSC China open Guanzhuo, China
- 2019 – Route Setter – IFSC Asian Youth Championship Combined Chongqing, China
- 2019 – Chief Route Setter – IFSC Asian Youth Championship Bengaloru, India
- 2020 – Route Setter – IFSC European Championships Moscow, Russia
- 2021 – Route Setter – IFSC Youth World Championships Voronezh, Russia
- 2022 – Route Setter – IFSC World Cup Innsbruck, Austria
- 2022 – Route Setter – IFSC European Championships Munich, Germany
- 2022 – Chief Route Setter – IMSCF National Championships Tehran, Iran
- 2022 – Chief Route Setter – IFSC Asian Championships Seoul, Korea
- 2022 – Chief Route Setter – IMSCF Training Camp Tehran, Iran
- 2022 – Chief Route Setter – IFSC Asian K Championships Jamshedpur, India
- 2023 – Chief Route Setter – Chinese Team Training Camp Beijing, China
- 2023 – Chief Route Setter – Asian Games Test Event Hangzhou, China
- 2023 – Chief Route Setter – IMSCF National Championships Tehran, Iran
- 2023 – Chief Route Setter – IFSC Youth World Championships Seoul, Korea
- 2023 – Chief Route Setter – IMSCF Training Camp Tehran, Iran
- 2023 – Chief Route Setter – 19th Asian Games Hangzhou, China
- 2024- Head Route Setter – West Asia Cup Riakh, Saudi Arabia
- 2024- Route Setter – IFSC World Cup Briancon, France
- 2024- Head Route Setter – IFSC Youth World Championships Guiyang, China
- 2025 – Head Route Setter – IMSCF National Championships Tehran, Iran
- 2025- Route Setter – IFSC Youth World Championships Helsinki, Finland

2026-Head Route Setter - National Championship, Kangan, Iran

- 2026- Head Route Setter – world Climbing Asian Games Nagoya, Japan

== Judging ==
=== Judging certificates ===
- IRI Sport Climbing and Mountaineering Federation – Sport Climbing National Judge

== Iran National Team memberships ==
- Junior National Team
  - 1999
- National Team
  - 2003
  - 2004 – China, Asian Championship
  - 2005 – Kerman (IRI), UIAA Asian Championship
  - 2006 – Kaoshiung (TPE), UIAA Asian Championships
  - 2007 – Qinghai (CHN), IFSC Climbing Worldcup (L+S)
  - 2009 – France, Bouldering Worldcup

== Ranks and medals ==
=== IFSC Climbing Worldcup ===
	2009	2007
Bouldering	29	
Lead	26	

=== UIAA Asian Championships ===
	2005	2006
Lead	19	10

=== Fajr championships ===
	1998	2002	2006
Lead	3	3	2

=== National championships ===
	2002	2006
Lead	3	1

=== Tehran Province championships ===
	2001	2002	2003	2004	2005	2006	2007	2008	2009	2010	2012	2013	2014	2022
Lead	1	1	1	1	2	1	1	1	1	2	2	2	2	1
Lead												2		

=== Tehran Province League ===
	2010	2011
Lead	1	1

=== Groups Cup ===
	2000
Lead	2

== Solo ==
- Mashalah, 7c, 20 meters, Overhanging & Roof, Kermanshah, Iran, 2006, first ascent
- Gordefa, 7a+, 25 meters, Polokhab, Iran, 2006, first ascent

== Climbing ==
Here are some of his Tops & First Ascent climbs:

Year	Name	Grade
1999	Mashallah	7c
1999	Alen	7b+/7c
2000	Iran Gate (SA)	8a+
2001	Safeh	8a
2002	Ghoul	7c+
2002	Nemat	7c
2002	Speed(FA)	7c
2002	Ashiane(FA)	8a
2003	Iran(FA)	7c+
2004	Iran Swiss	8a
2005	Khashol(FA)	7c
2006	Khoke chamosh(FA)	7c
2007	Ashianedoe(FA)	8a
2009	Solo(FA)	8a+
2010	Tehran Guy(FA)	7c
2011	Father & Son(FA)	7b+
2018	Marmolak	8a+
2018	Bargrizan	8a
2018	Ghij	7c+
2018	Shahin(Flash)	7c
2018	Push your must(FA)	7c+
2018	Pishadul(FA)	7c+
2019	Vampire(FA)	8b+
2019	Grezzly (FA)	8b
2019	Colony(FA)	8b+
2020	Sourkhpoost(Indian)	8a+
2020	Gladiator	8b+
2020	Merry Jain (FA)	8a+,8b
2020	Karimz(SA)	8b+
2021	Blue(TA)	8a

== Roc Trips ==
- Petzl 2008
- Petzl 2009
- Petzl 2014

== Filmography ==
- Mashalla

== Routes Bolted ==
Here are some of the routes he bolted:

Year	Name	Grade
2006	Khashol	7c
2006	Pichol	8b
2007	Khoke chamosh	7c+
2009	O+	7c
2008	Solo	8b
2008	Toxic	8a+
2009	Emperor project	?
2010	Tehran guys	8a
2011	Gladiator	8b+/8c
2011	Father and Son	7c
2013	Vampire	8b+
2014	Ati	7b+
2018	Colony	8b+
2018	Pishadul	7c+
2019	Surkhpoost (Indian)	8a
2020	Merry Jain	8a+
2020	Kingdom	project
2033	In the Name of Freedom	Project
