= Farshid Manafi =

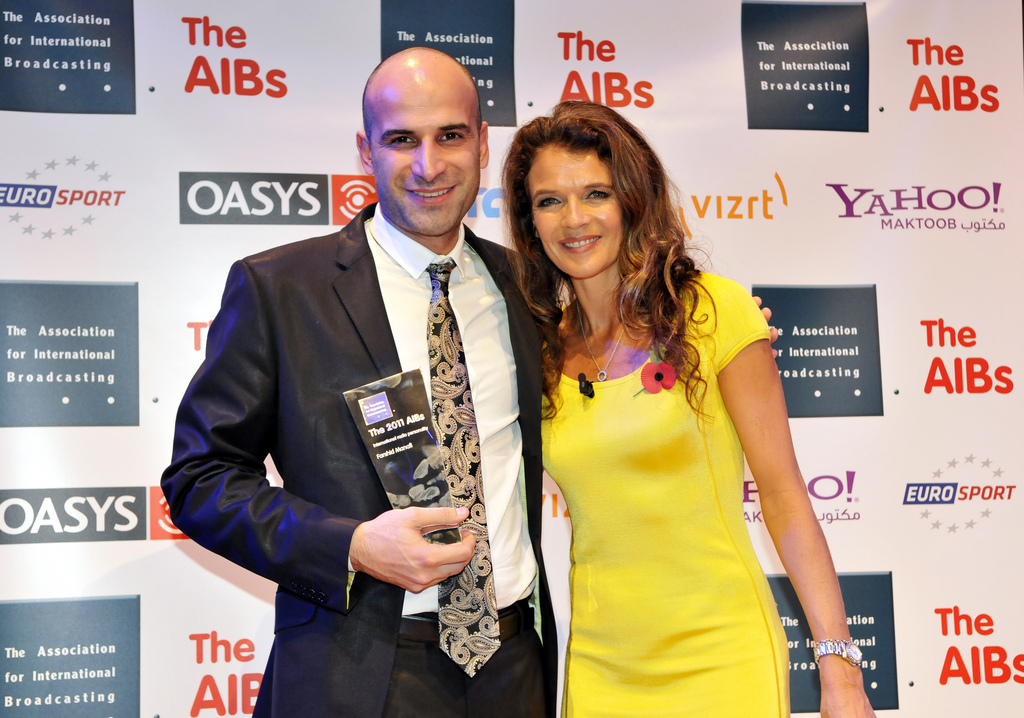
Farshid Manafi

Farshid Manafi (Persian: فرشید منافی) (born 13 August 1979) is an Iranian popular radio presenter and radio programme producer. He was one of the Radio Javan producers performing the "On the youth line" program. He left Iran on 2010 and currently is living in Prague, working with Radio Farda and performs a political comedy radio program named as "Thursday & Wednesday Station with Farshid Manafi" (previously as "Radio of the day after tomorrow" an alternative to the "Radio Farda"'s name means "Radio Tomorrow").

== Career activities ==
=== Radio of the day after tomorrow ===
From May–June 2010 he was performing a 5-days-a-week program called as "Radio of the day after tomorrow". After 1000 episodes in 6 seasons, this program ended by 1 March 2016.

=== Thursday Station ===
This refreshed program started by Oct 2016 as a 4 hours program weekly. Music, Iranian cyberspace (web-relative subjects) and audience relations are the main parts of the program.

=== Farda Station ===
After 'Thursday Station' was finished, this program was followed by 'Farda Station' which started at November 2017. 'Farda Station' is broadcast twice weekly (on Wednesdays and Thursdays).

== Awards ==
- London AIB awards 2011, won "International radio personality"
- New York Festivals Radio Awards 2011, "Best Announcer Presentation" and "Best Regularly Scheduled Talk Program."
