= Nile Green =

English historian and author (born 1972)

Nile Green (born 1972) is a Los Angeles-based English historian and author. He is known for his book Empire's Son, Empire's Orphan.

His books have won several awards and prizes, including the Bentley Book Prize from the World History Association, the Albert Hourani Book Award from the Middle East Studies Association, and the Ananda K. Coomaraswamy Book Award from the Association for Asian Studies. He was elected as a Guggenheim Fellow in 2018.

Green is the inaugural holder of the Ibn Khaldun Endowed Chair in World History at the University of California, Los Angeles (UCLA). He was previously the William Andrews Clark Professor of History. He has authored ten books, edited eight books, and written over ninety articles.

His writings examine the different ways in which Muslims have responded to the rise of the West and to the modern world in general, as well as Muslim responses to Christianity, Hinduism, and Buddhism. He has also written extensively about Islam and globalization, and Sufism. His publications focus not only on the Middle East, but on the larger Muslim communities of Asia and Africa, as well as Europe and the United States. He has also written about the Indian Ocean and the Persianate world.

Green also hosts the podcast Akbar's Chamber: Experts Talk Islam.

== Biography ==
He was born and educated in the United Kingdom, holding degrees from the University of London and the University of Cambridge. He began his academic career as the Milburn Junior Research Fellow at Oxford University before moving to the United States. At UCLA, Green served as the founding director of the Program on Central Asia for eight years, fostering research on historical and contemporary connections within the region. Green has also held visiting positions at institutions such as the École des Hautes Études en Sciences Sociales in Paris and has received fellowships, including the Luce/ACLS Fellowship in Religion, Journalism & International Affairs. He has a cat.

Green has researched and traveled among Muslims in around twenty countries, including India, Pakistan, Afghanistan, Iran, Syria, Saudi Arabia, Yemen, Morocco, Kenya, Tanzania, South Africa, China (Xinjiang), Uzbekistan, Kazakhstan, the Caucasus, Myanmar, Malaysia, Sri Lanka, and the Balkans.

Green's books have been reviewed in many major publications, including the New York Times, Wall Street Journal, Los Angeles Review of Books, New York Review of Books, Foreign Affairs, Time Literary Supplement, and The Spectator. His books have also been reviewed in national newspapers in India, Pakistan, Australia, and Canada.

How Asia Found Herself: A Story of Intercultural Understanding was chosen as a best book of 2023 by Foreign Affairs. The Love of Strangers: What Six Muslim Students Learned in Jane Austen’s London was selected as an Editors’ Choice by the New York Times and Pick of the Week by the Sydney Morning Herald. It also featured on the radio program, The World.

Green is a regular contributor to the Los Angeles Review of Books.

== Selected bibliography ==
- Green, Nile (2024). Empire's Son, Empire's Orphan: The Fantastical Lives of Ikbal and Idries Shah. W. W. Norton & Company. ISBN 978-1324002413.
- Green, Nile (2022). How Asia Found Herself: A Story of Intercultural Understanding. Yale University Press. ISBN 9780300257045.
- Green, Nile. (2020). Global Islam: A Very Short Introduction. Oxford. ISBN 9780190917234.
- Green, Nile (2019). The Persianate World: The Frontiers of a Eurasian Lingua Franca. University of California Press. ISBN 9780520300927. Free online version available.
- Green, Nile, ed. (2017). Afghanistan's Islam: From Conversion to the Taliban. University of California Press. ISBN 9780520294134. Free online version available.
- Green, Nile (2016). Afghan history through Afghan eyes. New York, NY: Oxford University Press. ISBN 978-0-19-049223-6.
- Green, Nile (2015). The Love of Strangers: What Six Muslim Students Learned in Jane Austen's London. Princeton University Press. p. 410. ISBN 978-0691210407.
- Green, Nile (2014). Terrains of Exchange: Religious Economies of Global Islam. London: Hurst & Company. ISBN 978-1-84904-428-8.
- Green, Nile (2012). Sufism: A Global History. Chichester: Wiley-Blackwell. p. 286. ISBN 978-1-4051-5765-0.
