= Payam Tehran F.C. =

Iranian football club

Payam Tehran Football Club (Persian: باشگاه فوتبال پیام تهران) is an Iranian football club based in Tehran, Iran that participates in the Tehran Football League since the 1980s. The club now has focus on the youth academy to educate and train a new generation of football players. The veteran team of the club, which are players of over 35 years old, participate in the Veteran premier football league of Iran every year.
