= Farshid Delshad =

Iranian scholar

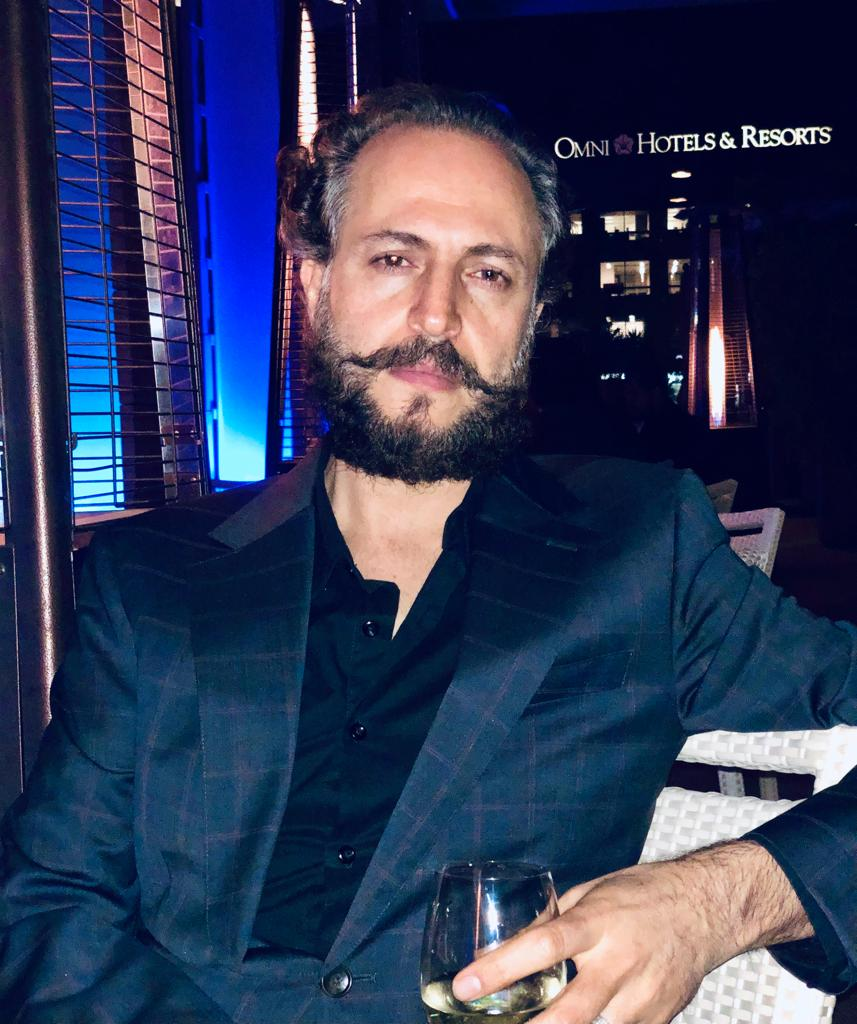
- Farshid Delshad, Judeo-Persian Conference, Paris 2020
- Occupations: Academic, writer, translator, researcher

Farshid Delshad (Persian: فرشید دلشاد) is an affiliated researcher, scholar of linguistics and Iranian Studies. He was Lecturer of Persian and Comparative Linguistics at University of Freiburg and at University of Bern. Delshad's first PhD and academic thesis at Tbilisi State University in 2000 dealt with Comparative Linguistics and Caucasian Studies.

Delshad received his postdoctoral from Friedrich Schiller University in Jena, Germany in Historical-Comparative Linguistics and his thesis was Philological Studies on Iranian and Semitic Loanwords in Classical Georgian. He has further specialized in German and Indo-Germanic linguistics. Since 1994 he has been working as a scholar of Iranian and comparative linguistics in Germany, and Switzerland. He is currently working at the Middle East Institute as a teaching faculty. Farshid Delshad has contributed to minority research, namely religious and ethnic populations in the Islamic World. He has also written extensively on Intercultural Communication and Sufism. He is also a translator of Russian and Georgian literary works to Persian and vice versa. He is the first Persian translator of the Knight in the Panther's Skin, a Georgian medieval epic poem, written in the 12th century by Georgia's national poet Shota Rustaveli. He worked as a cultural advisor and certified interpreter for the United Nations in Geneva.

== Podcasts ==
Orientalistics: Podcast on Language, Religion and Culture

== Books ==
- Pournia, Solomon (2023). The promised land of Israel, an in-depth look at Zionism in the Quran and in Jewish history. Translated by Dr. Farshid Delshad. Fulton books. ISBN 979-8-88505-471-3.
- Nezhad, Shahin; Delshad, Farshid (2023). Irānshahr and the Downfall of the Sassanid Dynasty. Persia at the Eve of the Arab Invasions. Logos Verlag. ISBN 978-3-8325-5611-2.
- Habib Levy (2022): Worldviews and Ideas. Collections of Sociocultural Essays. Edited by Nahid Pirnazar Oberman. Translated and Reviewed by Farshid Delshad Habib Levy Cultural Foundation Chino Hills, CA.
- Nezhad, Shahin (2021). Zoroaster, A Global Perspective. Translated by Dr. Farshid Delshad. Iranian Renaissance Foundation. ISBN 978-1736881903.
- Delshad, Farshid (2015). Modern Persian Textbook. Wiesbaden: Reichert Publishing.
- Delshad, Farshid (2010). Interaction of Religion, Morality, and Social Work. Munich: AVM. ISBN 9783899754483.
- Georgica et Irano-Semitica, Studies on Iranian and Semitic Loanwords in Classical Georgian, Philological Approaches towards Historical-Comparative Linguistics, Deutscher Wissenschafts-Verlag (DWV) Baden-Baden 2009.
- Chrestomathy of Classical and Modern Persian Prose from 9th to 21st Century with Biographical Surveys, Annotations and a Concise Persian-German Dictionary, Harrasowitz Publishing, Wiesbaden 2007 (New Edition 2009).
- Anthologia Persica, A Selection of Classical and Modern Persian Poetry from 9th to 21st Century, with Biographical Surveys, Annotations and a Concise Persian-German Dictionary, Logos Publishing, Berlin 2007 (New Edition 2009).
- Periodica Persica, Persian Newspaper and Scientific Reading, with Annotations, Exercises and Persian-German Glossary, Logos Publishing, Berlin 2007 (New Edition 2009).
- One Thousand and One Georgian Proverbs (ათასერთი ქართული ანდაზა) with Tea Shurgharia (თეა შურღაია). Bilingual, A Comparative Translation from Georgian, (Persian Title: Hezāro yek żarbolmasal-e gorǧī), Publication of Ministry of Foreign Affairs, Tehran 2000.
- Shota Rustaveli, Knight in the Panther's Skin, A Georgian National Epic, Translation and Rendering, (Persian Title: Palangīnehpūš), Iran-Jam Publishing House, Tehran 1998.
