= Farshad Khazei =

Iranian born entrepreneur (born 1965)

Farshad Khazei (born 6 July 1965) is an Iranian born entrepreneur who is currently living in Hungary. He is renowned for his real estate activities, mainly in Canada and Eastern Europe.

== Early life and education ==
Farshad Khazei was born in Tehran, Iran, to Farah Kazemi and Iraj Khazei. He left Iran in 1977 and was later joined by his family. He conducted his studies in Switzerland, England and Canada. In the UK, he attended the Redrice School and the Wellingborough School. In Canada he graduated with BSc in genetics from University of Alberta and later he did his masters in Urban Planning and Design at University of Toronto. He obtained his medical degree at Semmelweis University in Hungary in 1998.

== Career ==
After a short time in the family business, in 1988 he started working for Brisbin Brook Beynon Architects and worked on projects such as Metro Hall, SkyDome, Fukuoka Dome in Japan, Rogers Arena in Vancouver and several other multifunctional buildings. He founded Habitat in 1999 in Hungary and later on cofounded Telefound. From 2001 until 2015, he was the Chairman and President of Foundation Development Inc. in Hungary. Since 2007, his companies are part of the Abitare Inv. Group.

In late 2002 he signed an agreement with the government of Hungary for 90 years to develop the World Heritage Site Varkert Bazar in Budapest, Hungary. However, the project became entangled in legal battles with the government just prior to the start of the construction. The case was finally settled in his favour by the court of arbitration in 2014.

His business interests are varied, from development and architecture to telecommunication and food production. His work has been featured in publications such as The New York Times, CBC radio and Diplomacy and Trade to name a few.

Because of his work on a number of heritage buildings, he was appointed to lead the development of the Dreschler-Palace, commonly known as the Ballet Institute in Budapest and similar buildings in Vienna, Austria.

From 2005, he was the president of Run for Cancer Research Foundation ("Fuss a Rákkutatásért Alapítvány" in Hungarian), which was affiliated to the Terry Fox Foundation. The foundation has donated over 150 million HUF for cancer research in Hungary since 1999.
