= Houshang =

Houshang or Hushang is a given name. Notable people with the name include:

- Houshang Asadi (born 1951), Iranian journalist and writer
- Houshang Golmakani (born 1954), Iranian journalist, film critic and director
- Houshang Golshiri (1938–2000), Iranian fiction writer, critic and editor
- Houshang Kargarnejad (born 1945), retired Iranian heavyweight weightlifter who competed at the 1976 Summer Olympics
- Houshang Moradi Kermani (born 1944), Iranian writer best known for children's and young adult fiction
- Houshang Mashian (born 1938), Iranian-Israeli chess master
- Houshang Montazeralzohour (1947–1982), Iranian Greco-Roman wrestler who competed in the 1976 Summer Olympics
- Houchang Nahavandi (1932–2025), Iranian politician and academic administrator
- Houshang Ostovar (1927–2016), Persian symphonic music composer and instructor
- Houshang Rafati, Iranian basketball player
- Amir Houshang Keshavarz Sadr (1933–2013), scholar of Iranian history and a prominent civic-nationalist activist
- Houshang Seddigh (1948–2020), Iranian retired fighter pilot
- Houshang Zarif (1938–2020), Iranian master musician and renowned tar player
- Hushang, a character in the Persian epic Shahnameh
- Hushang Ansary (1927–2026), Iranian-American diplomat, businessman and philanthropist
- Hushang Ebtehaj (1928–2022), Iranian poet
- Hushang Hamidi, Iranian Kurdish politician
- Hushang Harirchiyan (1932-2024), Iranian actor and comedian
- Hushang Irani (1925–1973), Iranian poet, translator, critics, journalist and painter
- Hushang of Shirvan (died 1382), the 32nd ruler of Shirvan and last member of the Kasranid branch of House of Shirvanshah
- Hushang Shah (1406–1435), medieval ruler of Malwa, India
- Hushang Mirza (1604–1628), Indian prince, grandson of the Mughal Emperor Akbar

== See also ==
- Hoshan (disambiguation)
- Husan
- Hushang (name)
