= Hushang (name) =

Origin
- Origin: Persian
- Region of origin: Iran

Hushang, Hooshang, Hoshang, or Houshang (Persian: هوشنگ) is a Persian male given name popular in Iran.

== Given name ==
- Hushang, a character in the Persian epic Shahnameh
- Hushang Ansary (1927–2026), Iranian-American diplomat, businessman and philanthropist
- Hushang Ebtehaj (1928–2022), Iranian poet
- Hushang Hamidi, Iranian Kurdish politician
- Hushang Harirchiyan (1932–2024), Iranian actor and comedian
- Hushang Irani (1925–1973), Iranian poet, translator, critics, journalist and painter
- Hushang of Shirvan (died 1382), the 32nd ruler of Shirvan and last member of the Kasranid branch of House of Shirvanshah
- Hushang Shah (1406–1435), medieval ruler of Malwa, India
- Hushang Mirza (1604–1628), Indian prince, grandson of the Mughal Emperor Akbar

== Etymology ==
The Avestan equivalent of Hushang is Haošyaŋha. Older sources interpreted the second part of the name as -šyaŋh, composed of ši- 'dwelling' and -aŋh 'giving rise to', thus meaning 'he who produces good dwellings' or 'promoter of culture and sedentary living'. According to another interpretation, the second part of the name is -šiiah- a variant of čiia- 'selecting, deciding', giving the whole name *hu-šiiah- the meaning 'good (religious) choice'.

== See also ==
- Husan
- Houshang
