= Fighting Cock Society =

20th-century Iranian arts association

- Official logo of the collective
- Formation: April 15, 1949
- Headquarters: Tehran, Iran

The Fighting Cock Society (Persian: انجمن هنری خروس جنگی, romanized: Anjoman-e Honari-ye Khorus Jangi) was a 20th-century Iranian arts association, active in the 1950s, and devoted to the promotion of modern arts in the fields of painting, theatre, music, poetry, and literature. This was the first Surrealist society in Iran.

== History ==
The group was established in 1949 by painters Jalil Ziapour, Mahmoud Javadipour, and Javad Hamidi; alongside Gholamhossein Gharib (painter), Hassan Shirvani (theater actor), and Morteza Hannaneh (musician). The society also published a magazine with the same title. The headquarters of the society was Ziapour's studio on Takht-e-Jamshid Street in Tehran.

The first meeting of the group was on 15 April 1949, to discuss the importance of the name, the symbolism, and how it aligned with their goals. The group meet weekly. He declared the society's purpose to be "a fight against the unrealistic traditionalism of the time" and chose a verse by Farrukhi Sistani as the motto of the society: "The story of Alexander is old and turned into a myth/ Bring a new word, for there is another sweetness to the new".

== Members ==
- Gholamhossein Gharib
- Javad Hamidi
- Morteza Hannaneh
- Mahmoud Javadipour
- Bahman Mohasses
- Hassan Shirvani
- Jalil Ziapour
- Hushang Irani
