= Bahman Mohasses =

Iranian artist (1931–2010)

Bahman Mohassess بهمن محصص
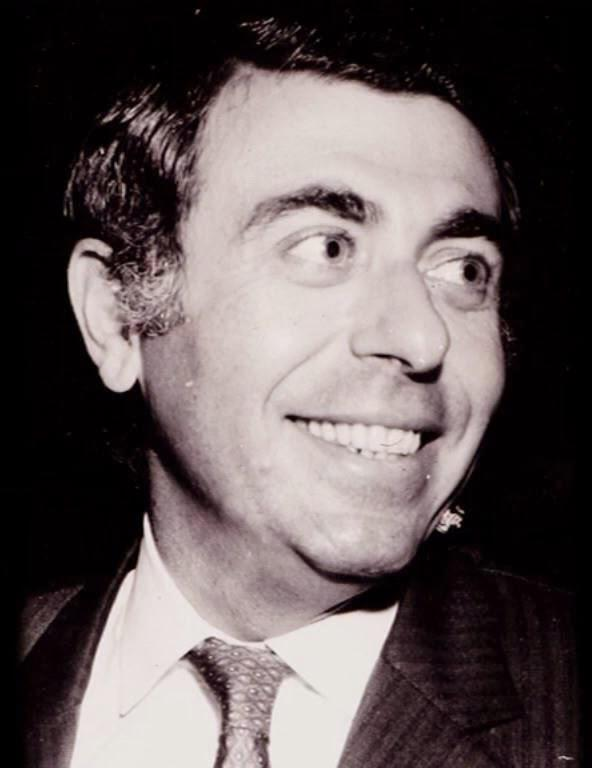
- Born: 1 March 1931; Rasht, Iran
- Died: 28 July 2010 (aged 79); Rome, Italy
- Known for: Painter, sculptor, translator, theatre director
- Spouse: Nezhat-al-Molook Mohasses (m. 1978; died 1998)
- Relatives: Ardeshir Mohasses (cousin)
- Website: bahmanmohassess.com

Bahman Mohassess (Persian: بهمن محصص, 1 March 1931 – 28 July 2010) was an Iranian painter, sculptor, translator, printmaker and theatre director. His oeuvre comprises paintings, sculptures, and collages. Known as "the irreverent" artist, Mohasses is said to have destroyed many of his own works, and those that become available at auction are now highly sought after. Mohassess is the most prominent artist who was openly gay in Iran, which is still stigmatized. He was the subject of the Mitra Farahani film documentary, Fifi Howls from Happiness (2013).

== Early life ==
Bahman Mohasses was born in 1931 in Rasht, Iran. The Mohasses house consisted of approximately 15 families who were land owners of Lahijan and were in the trade of tea and silk and lived in the Pordsar neighborhood of Lahijan.

According to Hossein Mahjoobi, "All Mohasseses had strange personalities, but Bahman seemed to be the most complex and unique of them." In his autobiographical documentary Fifi Howls from Happiness, Mohasses mentions that he is descended from the Mongols on his father's side and the Qajars on his mother's side. He was a cousin of the celebrated Iranian illustrator and cartoonist, Ardeshir Mohasses, residing in New York.

At age 14, he learned painting by apprenticing with Seyyed Mohammed Habib Mohammedi, who had studied art in Moscow at the Russian Academy of Arts.

He moved with his family from Rasht to Tehran, where he attended Tehran's Faculty of Fine Arts. During the same period he joined the "Cockfight Art and Culture Society" (Anjoman-e Khorous Jangi), established by Jalil Ziapour, and was, for some time, the editor of the literary and art weekly "Panjeh Khoroos" (Rooster Foot). Through this period, he was part of an avant-garde artistic movement, which included his good friend Nima Yooshij, known as the 'father of modern Persian poetry'; along with Sohrab Sepehri, Houshang Irani and Gholamhossein Gharib, who were all considered progressive artists of their time.

In 1954 he moved to Italy to study at the Accademia di Belle Arti di Roma.

== Career ==
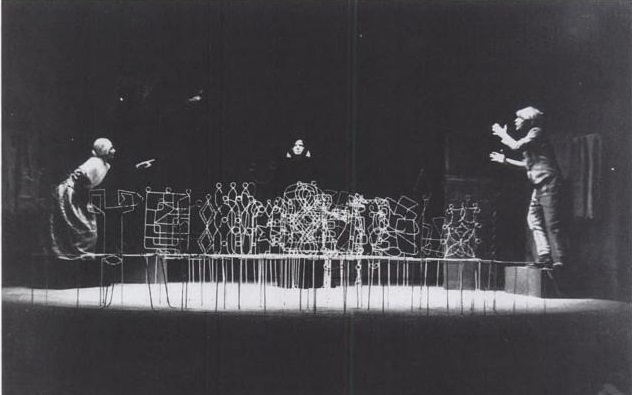
Chairs by Bahman Mohasses

He returned to Iran in 1964 and participated in Venice, São Paulo, and Tehran Biennale.

Mohasses directed plays, including Pirandello's Henry IV at Goethe Institute and Ghandriz Gallery in Tehran. He also translated books of several authors, including Eugène Ionesco, Malaparte, and Pirandello.

He stayed in Iran until 1968, before returning to Rome, where he received commissions for statues to be placed in Tehran. Some of his public works in Iran were destroyed or damaged after the Islamic Revolution in 1979, with the artist subsequently destroying all his remaining works in Iran. He occasionally travelled to Iran and died in self-imposed seclusion in Rome in 2010.

== Death and legacy ==
Mohasses died on July 28, 2010, in Rome, Italy at the age of 79. "Irreverent and uncompromising, a gay man in a hostile world, Mohassess had a conflicted relationship with his homeland—revered by elites in the art scene and praised as a national icon, only to be censored later by an oppressive regime. Known for his iconoclastic art as well as his scathing declarations, Mohasses abandoned the country over 30 years ago for a simple, secluded life in Italy."

Mohasses, unlike many of his contemporaries, did not make references to Persian artistic traditions and had a modern outlook. His paintings and sculptures depicted mythical Minotaurs and creatures out of nightmares in vast deserts of hopelessness.

In 2013, Iranian-born filmmaker Mitra Farahani wrote and directed the documentary, Fifi Howls from Happiness (original title: Fifi az khoshhali zooze mikeshad), based on an interview with Mohasses in his secluded hotel room. Ending abruptly with Mohasses succumbing literally on camera to lung cancer, the film explores the enigma of this provocative artist and presents a "final biography in his own words and on his terms."

He had served as a mentor to artist Parvaneh Etemadi.

== Personal life ==
In 1977, he married Nezhat-al-Molook, the daughter of his father's cousin, who was a teacher in Bandar-e-Anzali and later became the head of the Teaching College for Women. She died of brain cancer around 1998.

Mohasses said he was proud of his homosexuality and lived it fully. The stigma associated with his homosexuality affected his reception in Iran, where his work was exhibited with those of Francis Bacon, another gay painter, only in 2017, albeit these works being in storage of Tehran museum for decades.

== Filmography ==
- The Eye That Hears (1967; Cheshmi ke mishenavad)
- Fifi Howls from Happiness (2013; Persian transliterated: Fifi az khoshhali zooze mikeshad)

== See also ==
- Culture of Iran
- Islamic art
- Iranian art
- List of Iranian artists
