= Mitra Farahani =

Iranian filmmaker and painter

- میترا فراهانی
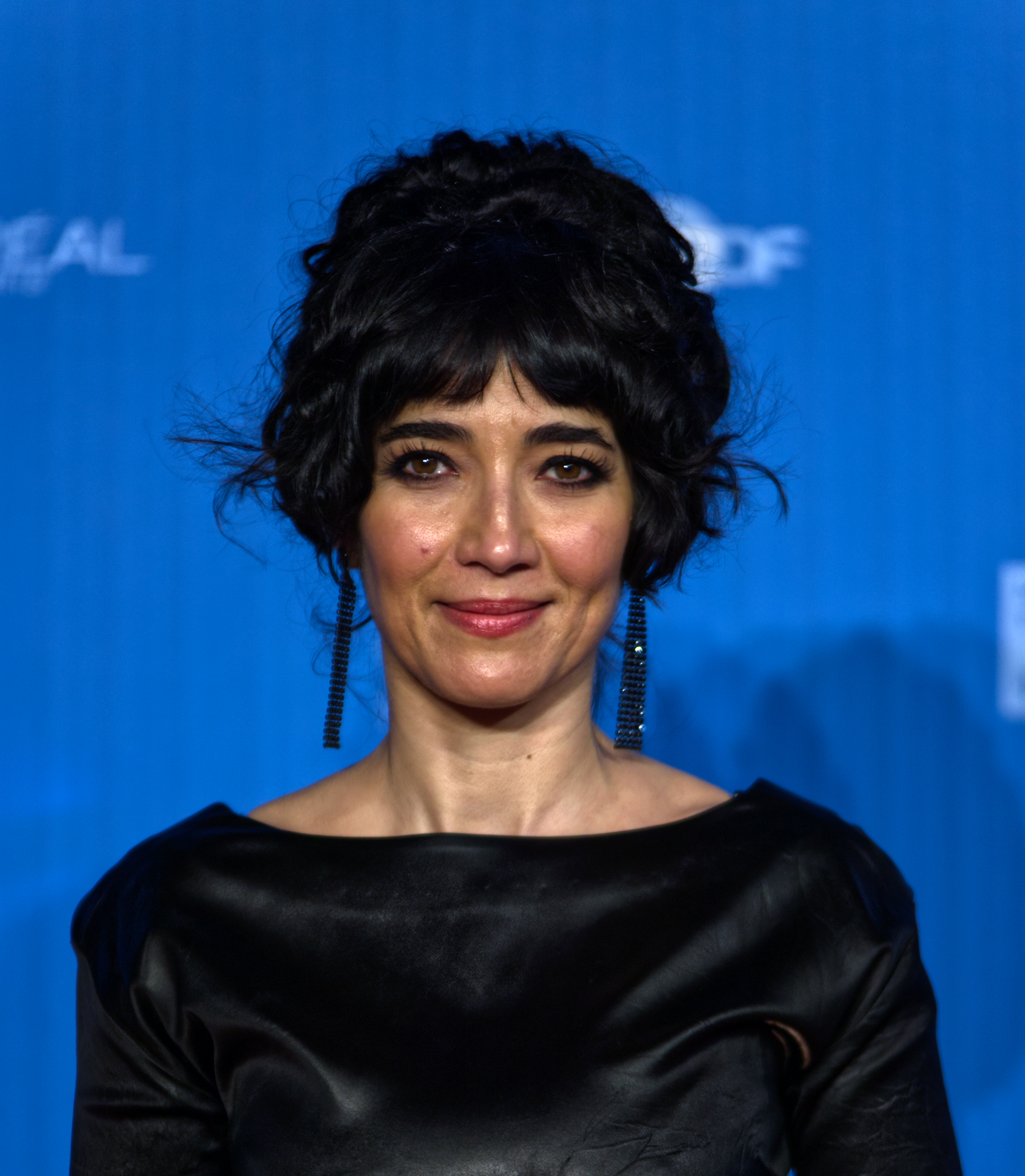
- Farahani at the 72nd Berlin International Film Festival, 2022
- Born: January 27, 1975 (age 51); Tehran, Pahlavi Iran
- Education: Islamic Azad University, École nationale supérieure des arts décoratifs
- Occupations: Filmmaker, painter
- Notable work: Fifi Howls from Happiness

Mitra Farahani (in Persian: میترا فراهانی; born 1975) is an Iranian filmmaker and painter who currently lives in Paris.

== Biography ==
Mitra Farahani was born on January 27, 1975, in Tehran, Iran. Farahani has a degree in graphic art (1997) from Islamic Azad University in Tehran. After graduation she moved to Paris in 1998. In 1999, she lived in Hamburg briefly. In 2000, she studied at École nationale supérieure des Arts Décoratifs (ENSAD) in Paris.

The film Tabous - Zohre & Manouchehr (2004) is about her artistic pursuits.

She was arrested on June 17, 2009, by the Iranian government, on her arrival in Tehran from Paris and held in Evin Prison. It is said that her arrest is linked to the crackdown of opposition by the Iranian government following the presidential election, and by angering the Iranian government by making non-Islamic films outside Iran. The Iranian government released her from prison on 30 June 2009.

After having screened several of her films at the festival, she was selected as a member of the jury for the 64th Berlin International Film Festival in 2014. She returned to the Berlin International Film Festival in 2022 with her documentary See You Friday, Robinson, selected in the section Encounters.

== Filmography ==
Farahani has directed several films including;

- Juste une femme (in English: Just a Woman) (2002), the first film about a gender reassignment in Iran, which was mostly shot on hidden cameras.
- Tabous - Zohre & Manouchehr (2004)
- Behjat Sadr: Time Suspended (2006)
- Fifi az Khoshhali Zooze Mikeshad (in English: Fifi Howls from Happiness) (2012), a documentary about the Iranian painter, sculptor and theatre director Bahman Mohasses.
- See You Friday, Robinson (French: À Vendredi, Robinson) (2022)

Farahani has worked as a cinematographer for films including;

- Ziarat (English: Pilgrimage)(2005)
- Fifi az Khoshhali Zooze Mikeshad (English: Fifi Howls from Happiness) (2012)

== Awards ==
Farahani's Juste une femme (in English: Just a Woman) film won a Teddy Award in 2002 at the Berlin International Film Festival (or Berlinale).

Her film See You Friday, Robinson (À vendredi, Robinson) premiered in the Encounters section of the 2022 Berlinale, and won it the New Horizons Film Festival in Wrocław, Poland.

== See also ==
- List of Iranian artists
- 2009 Iranian election protests
- Bahman Kiarostami, collaborated with Farahani
