= Jalil Ziapour =

Iranian artist (1920–1999)

- Born: 25 April 1920; Bandar-e Anzali, Sublime State of Iran
- Died: 21 December 1999 (aged 79); Tehran, Islamic Republic of Iran
- Resting place: Behesht-e Zahra (artists section)
- Occupations: Painter, academic member, researcher, writer

Jalil Ziapour (Persian: جلیل ضیاءپور, romanized: Jalīl Z̤iyāʼpūr; 25 April 1920 – 21 December 1999) was an Iranian painter, academician, researcher, and writer. He is considered to be the "father of modern Iranian painting". Besides having been a leading painter and the head of the futuristic movement, he has had many research activities in the fields of anthropology, study and familiarization with language, public culture, clothing and decorative designs of different regions of Iran, and their results are currently used in universities as reference books. During his cultural and artistic activity, Ziapour has performed giving more than 85 lectures, presenting more than 70 cultural and artistic articles, writing more than 28 books in the fields of Iranian clothing, art and history and also creating about 40 paintings and two statues. He was one of the founders of the Fighting Cock Society, an arts association.

== Biography ==
Jalil Ziapour was born in 1920 in Bandar-e Anzali, Qajar Iran. His childhood hobbies were forming statues from Anzali marshes mud and listening to music. He began his art studies since youth. After finishing primary education, he went to Tehran in 1938 and entered the Music School, which was directed by Mr. Minbashian then, for composing and passed the entrance tests; but at that time, the foreign professors of the school returned to their home countries and he was not able to follow his agenda. Therefore, he started studying and familiarizing with traditional arts in the School of Fine Arts at Tehran University (now University of Tehran).

In 1941, he entered the Beautiful Arts School. The first period of the school (1941–1945) announced three graduates in painting and Ziapour received the first place and the first class cultural medal from the school and headed to France by the scholarship presented by that country's government and continued studying in École nationale supérieure des Beaux-Arts in visual arts field.

In 1948, he returned to Iran, alongside other Iranian academy painters included Javad Hamidi, Shokouh Riazi, Ahmad Esfandiari, and Hossein Kazemi. Together they established for the first time activity in the field of contemporary painting in Iran.

In 1949, Ziapour established the artistic board "Fighting Cock", which was a leading committee in the field of modern arts in literature, theater, music and painting, and started printing a magazine with the same name with his proponents and presented his theory about visual arts (painting) called "Refute of the Theories of Past and Contemporary Ideologies -from Primitive to Surrealism". During his artistic activity as a painter, he was always considered as the leader of futurism and the developer of modern art and is the initiator of artistic criticism in Iran. Ziapour contended in four fronts: the followers of past methods, the degenerate modernists who had returned from abroad, the mass traditionalists, the followers of the old European method. His effort was to preserve the Iranian identity by leaning on the capacity of native culture, but speak by a global tongue and present it and eventually bring honor to his Iranian culture.

In 1951, Ziapour founded the School of Decorative Arts for Boys (Persian: Honarestān-e honarhā-ye zibā-ye pesarān) in Tehran.

In 1952, he was offered a job from the National General Agency of Beautiful Arts and performed many cultural-artistic activities, jobs and missions like founding the female and male high schools for visual arts, decorative arts school, dean of anthropology museum, etc. In 1979, he retired from public service and since then until his final days of life, he performed research, writing and teaching at the schools of dramatic and decorative arts, Islamic Art Collective, Tarbiat Modares and Al-Zahra Universities.

At 79 years of age, Ziapour died at the Tus hospital of Tehran on Tuesday, 21 December 1999, as a result of heart failure after spending a difficult period of disease, and two days later on December 23, he was buried at the artists section of Behesht-e Zahra.

== Fighting Cock Society ==
After his first return to Iran (1949), he founded the artistic society of Fighting Cock, which was a leading society in the fields of modern art about literature, theater, music and painting, and also started printing a magazine with the same name. The location of the society was the Ziapour Atelier at the Takht-e Jamshid Avenue. He announced the goal of the Fighting Cock Society "Contending Conservatism and Traditionalism far from the Realities of the Time".

Eventually, the opponents, who had introduced the Fighting Cock Magazine a publication associated with the Tudeh Party and believed cubism equal to communism, caused Ziapour's interrogation at the Official Misdemeanors Court and the banning of the magazine in 1949. Thereafter, he published another magazine titled "Kavir", which was also banned, and then continued reflecting his thoughts at the publication "Claw of Cock".

== Theory ==
Ziapour presented his art theory and view as a thesis titled "Refute of the Theories of Past and Contemporary Ideologies from Primitive to Surrealism" in October 1948 to cultural and journal societies; and in it, after presenting a short history of Occidental art ideologies, he considered all those ideologies ineffective for the main goal of painting and stated most of them as covers for supplying things other than painting. By that thesis, he became very close to the definition of single and abstract painting and looked at the material of modern painting, whose cleansing from literary, historical, social and so on is necessary in order to achieve an independent function of color, line, light and creative compositions. The general conclusions stated in the theory are:

1. The color and design are types of a far abnormal form and composition that the painting should act based on.
2. The more abnormal the concept in the painting is from the aspect of organization, the more complete and valuable from the aspect of specialty it is.
3. The concept of the painting, should not present the subject, the phrase and the result "like normal writings"; since every line and color, every form and every composition, is by itself possessing the subject and phrase and result and subsequently the concept; therefor, any form and picture and concept inclined to the familiar nature is contradictory with the profession of painting.
4. The more the natural and close unnatural pictures are replaced by combinations of color and design and other professional factors, the more the painting progresses towards perfection, where it can earn its beauties and individual pleasures further.
5. If the painting contains natural or close unnatural pictures, the artist should deliberately destroy them so that it becomes dissimilar to the normal nature in order to show the artistic factors completely and without any parasites.
6. In painting without a picture, which means outside natural and close unnatural pictures, the artist understands their own assignment and knows that they should directly perform artistic factors, i.e. forming more accurate and pleasant synchronizations and more lively and meaningful designs, in order to make specialized beauties. In this stage, both the artist and the public, especially those who "believed to have understood specialized beauty by realizing normal and visual concepts like their own memories and wishes", understand their assignments; and from now on, they refer directly to artistic factors in order to understand the beauty of the painting, not to the visual concepts or the picture itself. That will be the first stage where the artist and the public both find out the truth about specialized beauty or specialized aesthetics.
7. Until now, painting has not reached its limits of specialized art and beauty and has had a very close interaction with other beautiful arts especially the literature of "descriptive events". By applying this theory, an ideology which we call "perfect" is born that separates the limits and borders of painting from other arts. This place, i.e. "the perfect ideology", will be the true home of professional and specialized painting- apart from other arts; and from here, painting will show itself with a more extensive concept.
8. The beauty of painting is different from that of other fine arts, and should be inspected separately.
9. No new method is ever born without the required environment; and no request can ever be ahead of the current request of its time; because every request has a factor; and surely the main factor of any motivated request in the society has a requester. Therefor, my theory is not outside the demand of my current time and can not be.

== Works ==
Ziapour's works are famous because of possessing original Iranian concepts, simplification of figures, loyalty to the traditional levels along with geometric lines of cubism, awareness of composition and generally the special style of painting. His research trip to Kavir and various Iranian regions for anthropological inspections, guided his attention towards nomadic lifestyle. He saw their behaviors, customs and traditions, clothes and adornments worth noticing and utilized those resources in his works and because of his research inclination toward farming lifestyle, nomadic concepts appeared in his works in an allegorical way.

Journalistic illustrations, researches on Iran and cultural and educational activities left him less time for creating more works.

Year	Name	Style	Technique	Size
1944	Himself	Impressionism	Oil painting	50*70
1945	Rise of Kaveh the Blacksmith	Impressionism	Oil painting	70*100
1949	Three Oriental chess players	Impressionism	Oil painting	50*80
1949	A girl in red skirt	Impressionism	Oil painting	40*60
1949	A rope	Cubism	Oil painting	60*80
1949	Ant riding	Expressionism	Oil painting	40*60
1949	Lifeless nature	Cubism	Oil painting	80*120
1949	Public bath	Cubism	Oil painting	80*120
1950	The Sepahsalar mosque	Cubism	Oil painting	80*120
1953	A Kurdish woman from Quchan	National and Ziapour-specific	Oil painting	83*200
1955	Anahita	Projecting	Plaster	70*75
1955	Amir flower and Bahar flower	National and Ziapour-specific	Oil painting	120*190
1956	Turkmen girl	National and Ziapour-specific	Oil painting	80*180
1959	Inside pain	Surrealism	Oil painting	70*70
1962	Zeynab Khatun	National and Ziapour-specific	Oil painting	95*120
1963	My man is binding Hina	National and Ziapour-specific	Oil painting	120*170
1966	Carpet blueprint	National and Ziapour-specific	Gouache	2*3
1979	Harbor woman	National and Ziapour-specific	Oil painting	70*160
1982	Lur girl	National and Ziapour-specific	Oil painting	92*180
1983	Nomads	National and Ziapour-specific	Oil painting	120*180
1984	Kurdish woman from Sanandaj	National and Ziapour-specific	Oil painting	90*180
1985	Anahita	National and Ziapour-specific	Oil painting	100*190
1991	My life	National and Ziapour-specific	Oil painting	82*160
1994	The world within	National and Ziapour-specific	Oil painting	120*150
1997	Me and flight	National and Ziapour-specific	Oil painting	105*135
1997	Mahsha	National and Ziapour-specific	Oil painting	110*140

== Bibliography ==
- 1949: A Theory about the Causes of the Weakness of Stating the Methods of Painting and Presenting the Procedure, Tehran
- 1953: The Art of Sculpture in Iran, Arash printing shop, Tehran
- 1953: The Ancient Clothing of Iranians until the end of the Sassanid Era, Publication of General Agency of Museums and public culture of the Ministry of Culture and Art, Tehran
- 1954: History of the General Art of the Orient, Middle East and Europe
- 1954: A Research about the General State, Settlement and Customs of the People of Gasemabad, Gilan
- 1956: A Research about the Aryans and the Way of Their Immigration to the Iranian Plateau
- 1958: A Research about the Clothings Abaya, Arkhalig, Yal, Ordered by Iran and Islam Encyclopedia, Publication of Tehran University
- 1966: A Research about the Importance of Tailing of Cloth by the Iranians of the Sassanid Era and Its Influence since the Rise of Islamamong Islamists and Others.
- 1967: The Clothings of Yils, Nomads and Farmers of Iran, Publication of the Ministry of Culture and Art, Tehran
- 1968: The Clothing of Olden People of the Iranian Plateau (before the arrival of the Aryans) until the Median Era.
- 1968: The Clothing of Iranian Women since the Oldest Times, Publication of the Ministry of Culture and Art, Tehran
- 1969: Adornments of Iranian Women since the Olden Times until Now, Publication of the Ministry of Culture and Art, Tehran
- 1970: The Clothing of Iranians since Fourteen Centuries Ago (From the rise of Islam until the end of Qajar era), Publication of the Ministry of Culture and Art, Tehran
- 1971: The Clothing of the Achaemenids and Medians Based on the Paintings of Takht-e Jamshid, Publication of the Ministry of Culture and Art, Tehran
- 1971: The Clothings of Prophet Zoroaster and the Clerics
- 1973: A Research about the Olden Aryans Settling in Central Asia and Their Initial Humanoid Thoughts
- 1973: A Research about the Clothing and Weaponry of the Olden Aryan People since the Era of Keyumars (Iranian Adam Allfather) untilJamshid the Jam.
- 1973: A Research about Alborz and its Similarities in Shahnameh
- 1974: Decorative Designs in Iran since the Oldest Times, Publication of the Ministry of Culture and Art, Tehran
- 1974: An Introduction to Coloring in Art Works since the Oldest Times until the Safavid Era, Publication of the Ministry of Culture and Art, Tehran
- 1974: The Medians and the Establishment of the First Kingdom in Western Iranian Plateau, Publication of the National Works Board
- 1974: A Research about Rostam, an Iranian Knight – Weaponry of the People of SistanRegions (Rostam's region)
- 1976: A Research about Sea Transportation in the Anzali Marsh and the Economic Status of the Residents around the Marsh, Ordered by the supreme council of culture and art
- 1977: Fifty Years of Iranian Contemporary Visual Art (Since Ghaffari until now)
- 1998: The Brief History of Iranian and Global Art, Publication of Jahad-e Daneshgahi of Art
- Dictionary of Gilaki Language (60000 words), Ready for printing
