= Javad Hamidi =

Iranian artist (1918–2002)

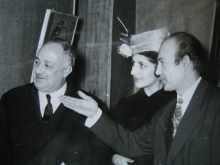
- Hamidi's solo exhibition in Paris (1934)
- Born: 1918; Hamadan, Sublime State of Iran
- Died: 2002 (aged 83–84); Tehran, Islamic Republic of Iran
- Education: Beaux-Arts de Paris; University of Tehran
- Occupations: Visual artist, educator
- Movement: Modernism

Javad Hamidi (1918 – 2002) was an Iranian Modernist painter, poet, and educator. He was a pioneer of modern art in Iran.

== Biography ==
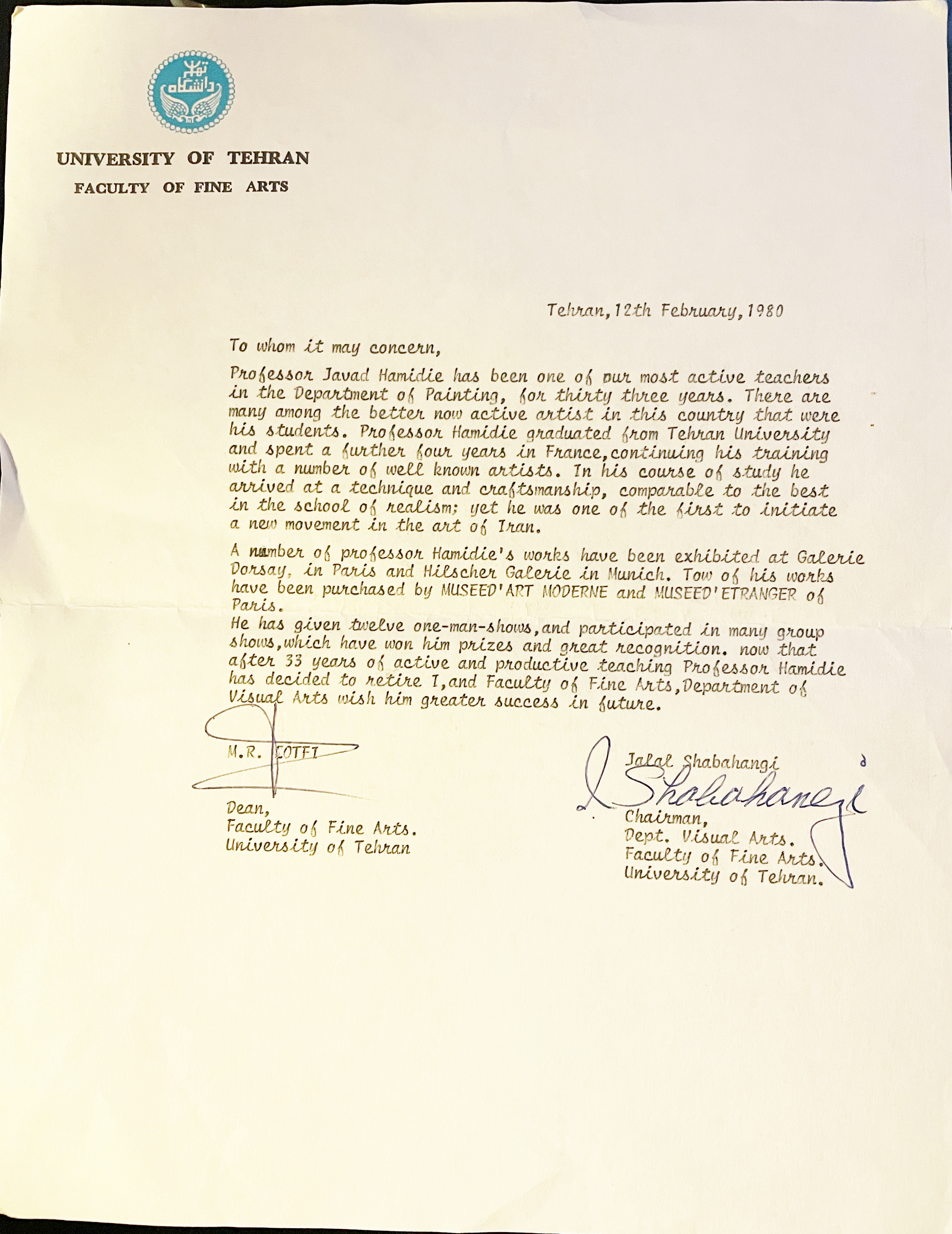
Javad Hamidi's retirement letter from the University of Tehran, dated February 1980

Javad Hamidi was born in 1918 in Hamadan, Qajar Iran. Hamidi studied in the Faculty of Fine Arts at Tehran University (now University of Tehran), and graduated in 1946; and at Beaux-Arts de Paris. His classmate was Shokouh Riazi, who studied alongside him in both Tehran and in Paris. He continued his studies under French painter André Lhote.

Hamidi had been a founding member of the "Fighting Cock Society" (Khorūs-e Jangi), an artists' group in Iran dedicated to the modern art movement and surrealism. Hamidi taught painting at Tehran University for almost 40 years, as well as at Al-Zahra, Azad and Tarbiat-Modares Universities.

In 2002, he was killed by a speeding motorcyclist in Tehran.
