= Hoshan =

Hoshan may refer to:

- Hoshan, a village in Duru District, Tanzania
- Hoshan or Ho-shan, a former romanization of Heshan, various places in China
