= Hushang Hamidi =

Iranian politician

Hushang Hamidi (Persian: هوشنگ حمیدی; born in Iran) is an Iranian Kurdish politician. He was the representative of Sanandaj in the 7th legislature term of the Iranian parliament (or Islamic Consultative Assembly). In the 2004 election he received 36.39% of votes, which was 107,708 total votes.
