= Hushang Irani =

Iranian poet and translator

- هوشنگ ایرانی
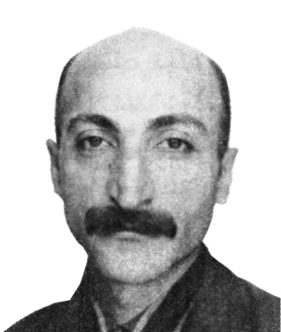
- Irani in 1952
- Born: 1925; Hamedan, Iran
- Died: September 4, 1973 (aged 47–48); Paris, France
- Resting place: Behesht-e Zahra
- Occupations: Poet; translator; painter; cleric; Journalist
- Writing career
- Period: 1948–1956
- Notable works: Spicy Violet on Grey Grey; The curtain came into flame and the Devil came in I think all about you now, I think about all of you now Some Designs Understanding of art: In the way to a worldview in art
- Literary movement: Modern literature, Surrealism

Hushang Irani (Persian: هوشنگ ایرانی; 1925 in Hamedan – 4 September 1973 in Paris) was an Iranian poet, translator, critic, journalist and painter. He is one of the pioneers of "The New Poetry" and surrealism in Iran.

== The Fighting Cock days ==
Founded in 1950, Khorus Jangi (Persian: انجمن خروس جنگی, The Fighting Cock Society) was a small artistic group that published a journal by same title. In the beginning, Khorus Jangi was not significantly different from other literary journals of the time. A year later, however, Hushang Irani, the enfant terrible of modernist Persian poetry, joined the group. Under his influence, the journal was transformed into a radical modernist literary journal. It published Irani's poems, which no other literary journal of the day, and even almost no literary critics on those days, would dare to acknowledge as poetry. Irani has shrewdly observed and anxiously realized how the potentials that Nima had introduced into Persian poetry were being co-opted: Nima and modernist Persian poetry were in the process of becoming mainstream. Understanding this double edge of youthful tradition, Irani had both praised and condemned Nima.

== Works ==
=== Books ===
- Poetry
  - Spicy Violet on Grey (Persian: بنفش تند بر خاکستری), Tehran, September 1951
  - Grey (Persian: خاکستری), Tehran, June 1952
  - The curtain came into flame and the Devil came in (Persian: شعله‌ای پرده را برگرفت و ابلیس به درون آمد), Tehran, November 1952
  - I think all about you now, I think about all of you now (Persian: اکنون به تو می‌اندیشم، به توها می‌اندیشم), Tehran, January 1956
  Designs
  - Some Designs (Persian: چند دِسَن), Tehran, April 1952
  Critical Essays
  - Understanding of art: In the way to a worldview in art (Persian: شناخت هنر: در راه یک جهان‌بینی هنری), Tehran, January 1952
  - A letter to Mr. Hussein Kazem-zade Iranshahr: about his collection "Confucius" that he published in Tehran (Persian: نامه به آقای حسین کاظم‌زاده ایرانشهر: دربارهٔ مجموعهٔ ایشان که به نام کنفسیوس در تهران منتشر شده‌است), Tehran, 1956

== Gallery ==
From the book "Some Designs" (Persian: چند دِسَن), Tehran, April 1952

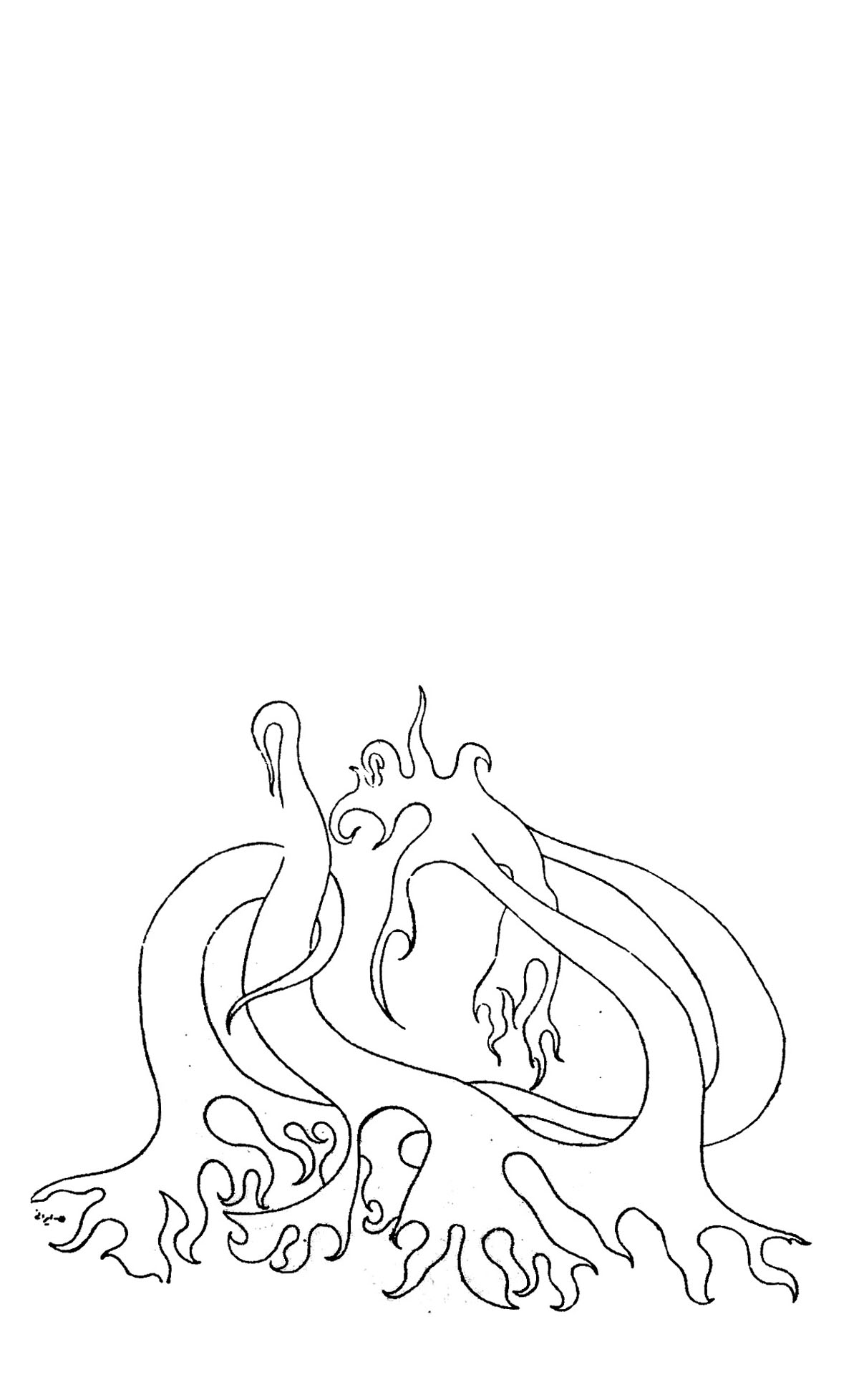

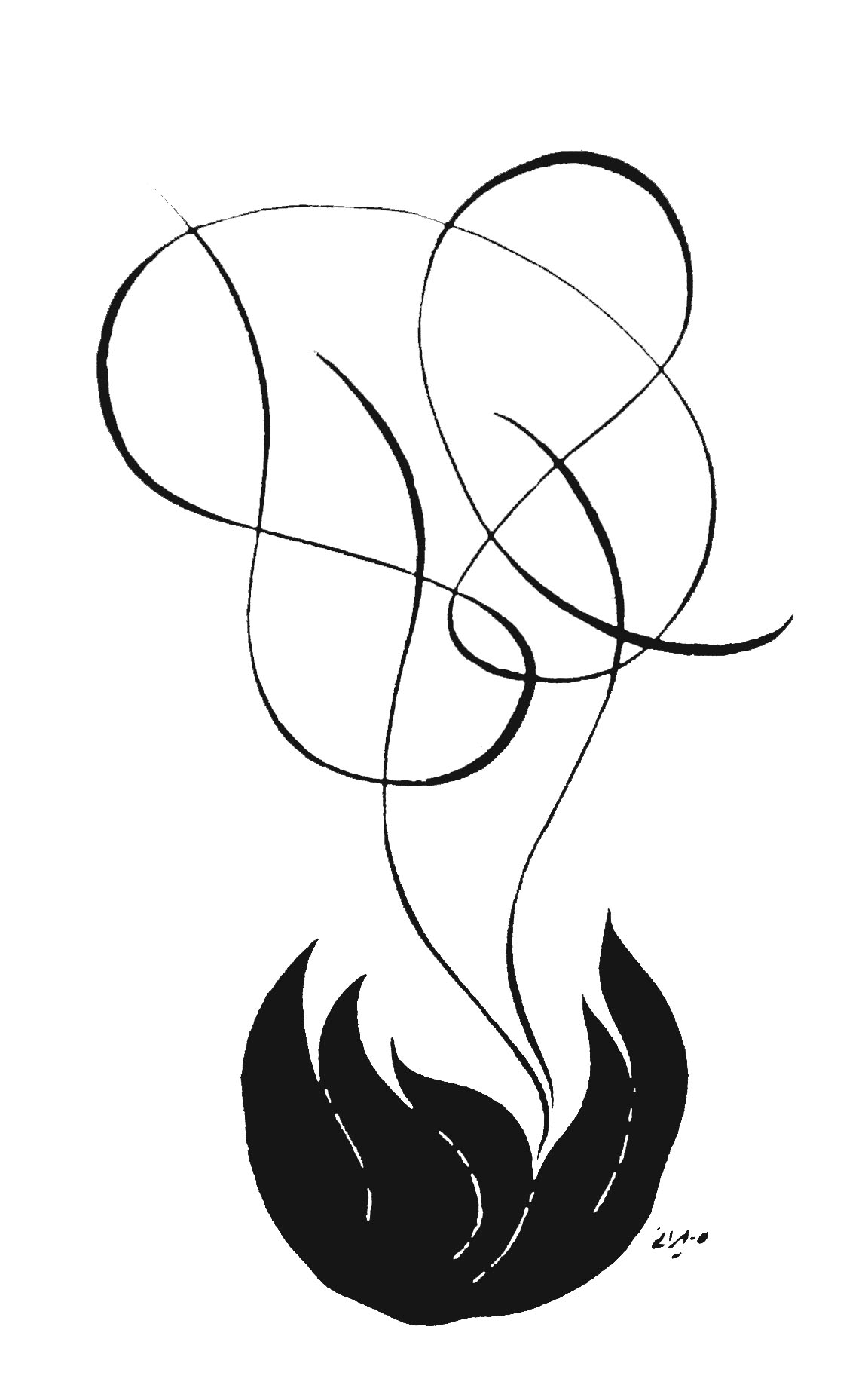

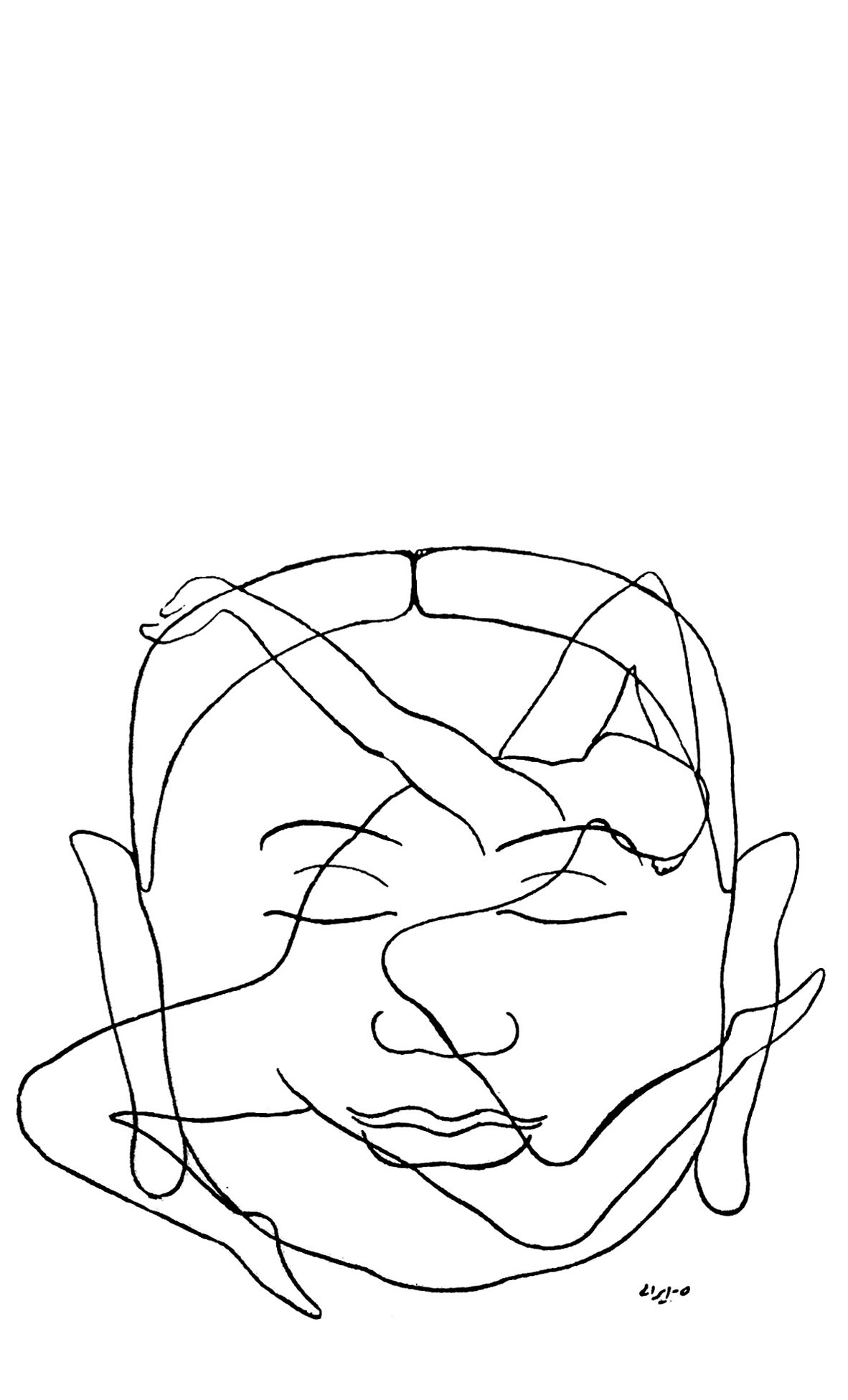

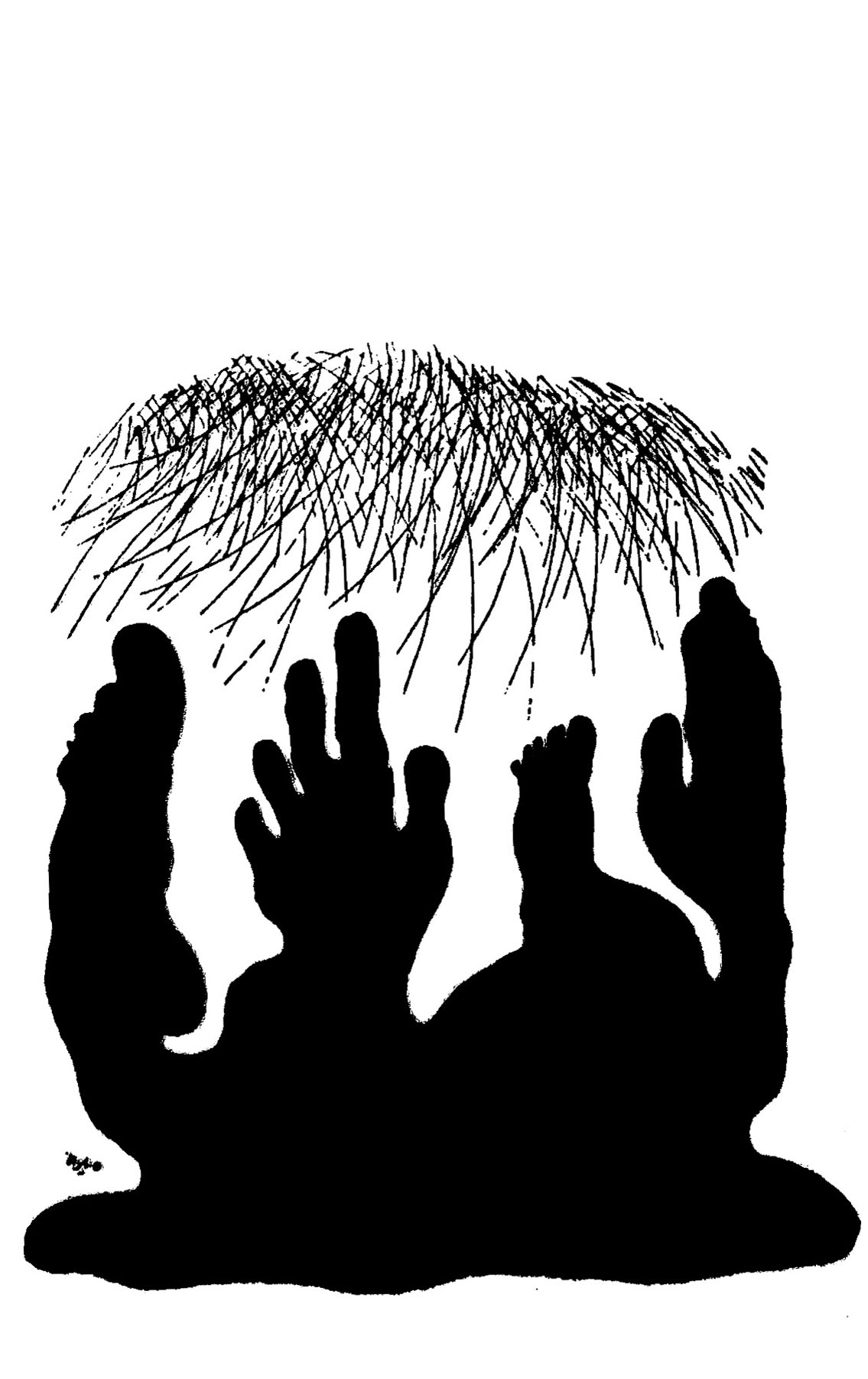

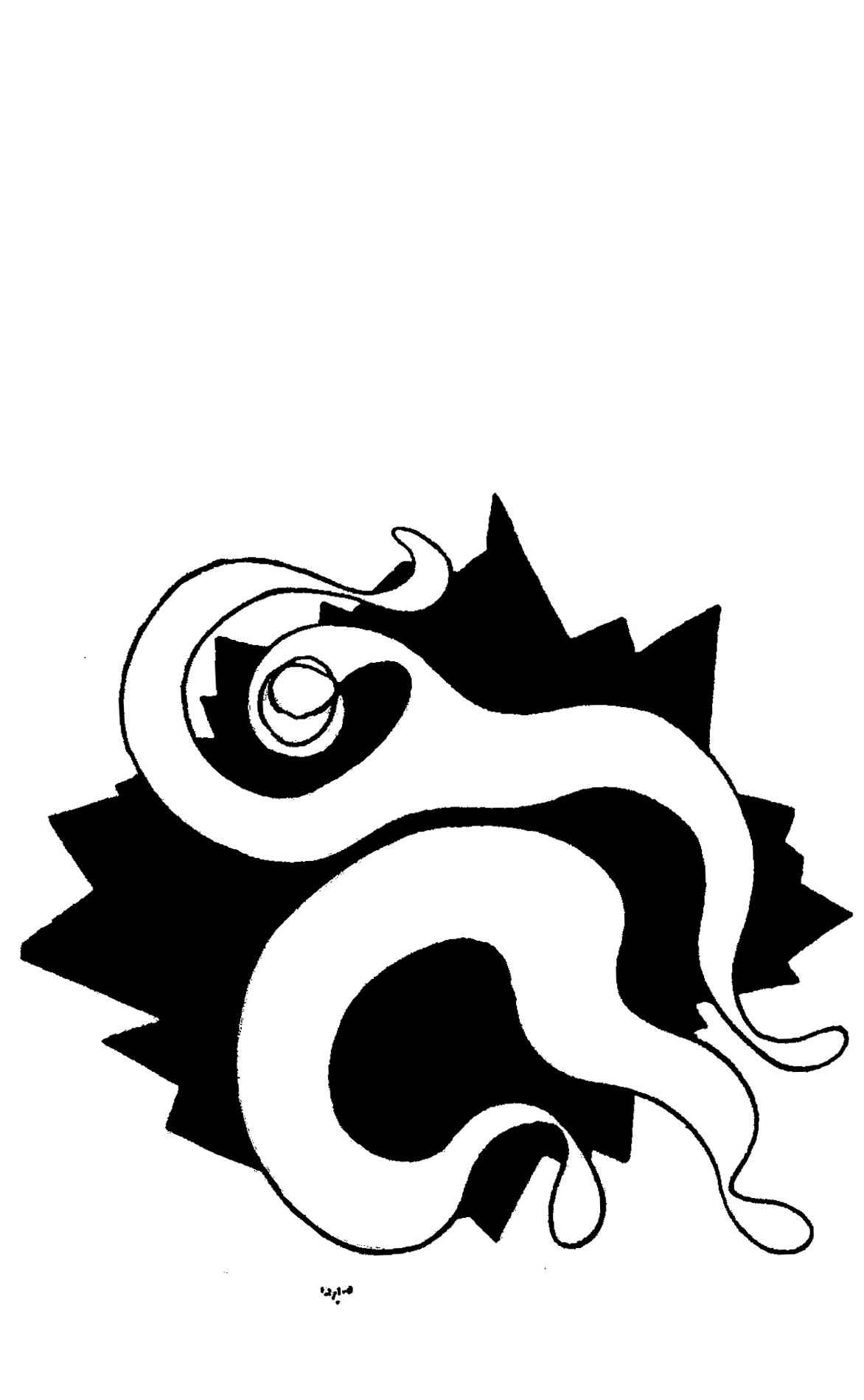

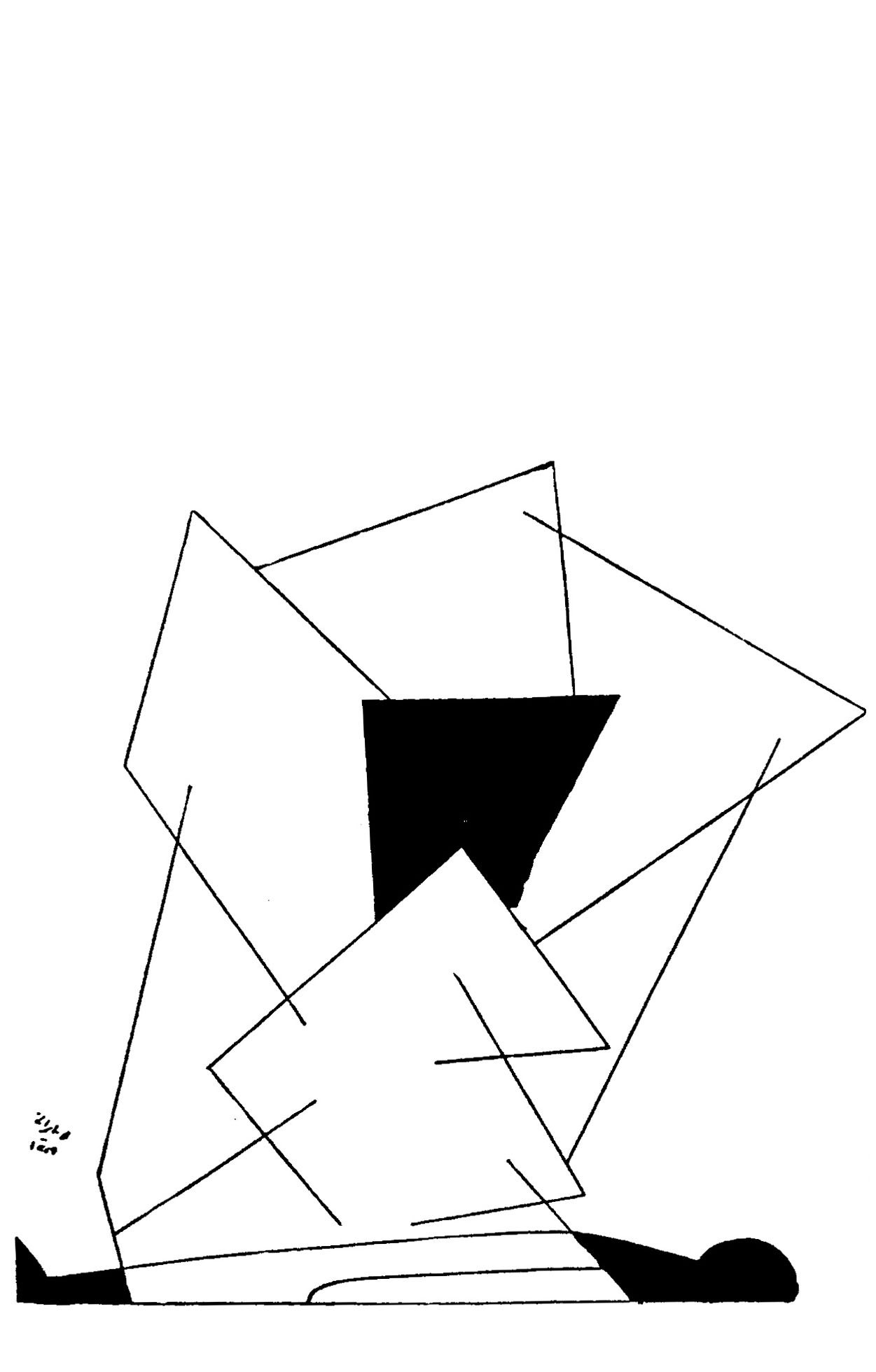

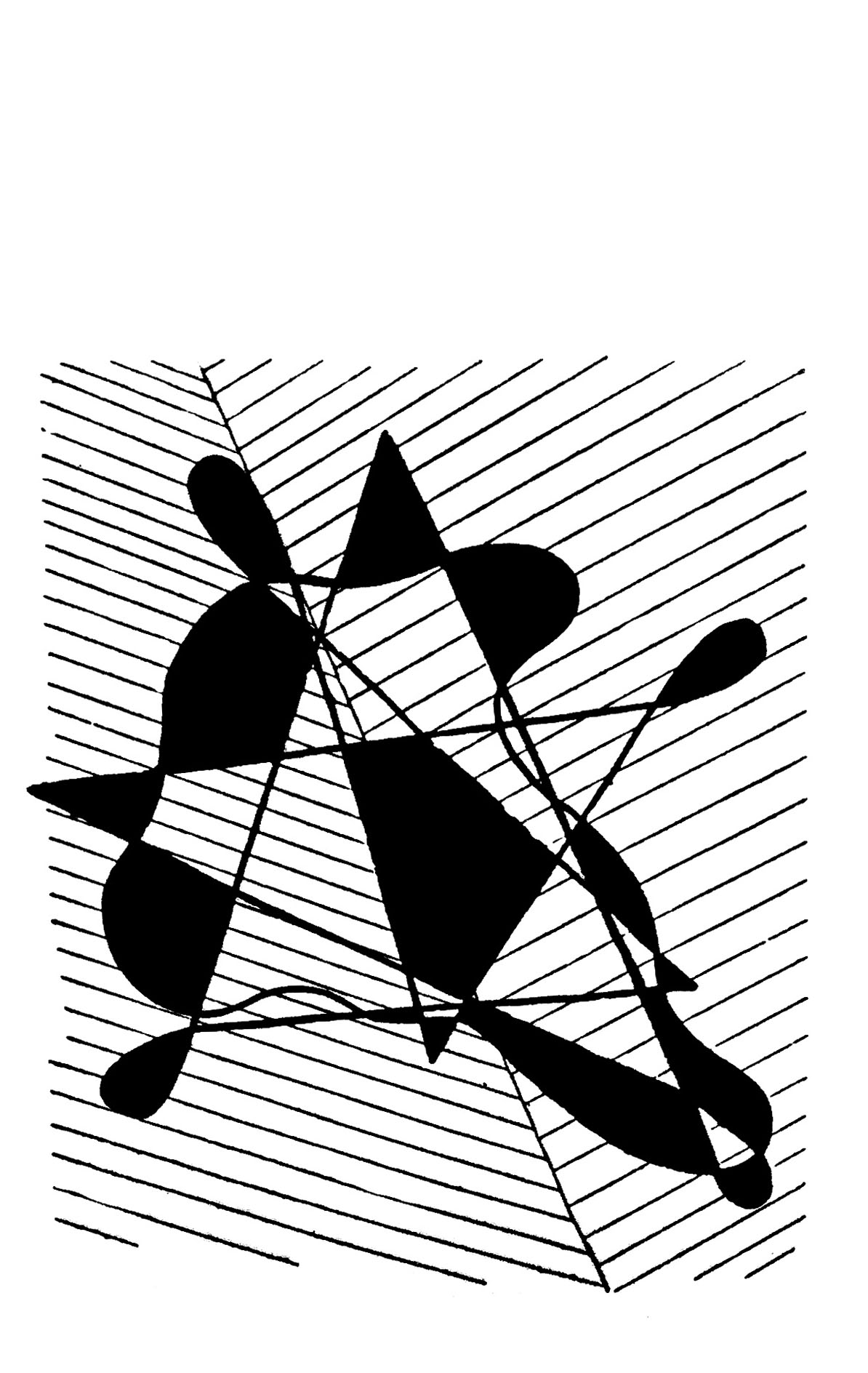

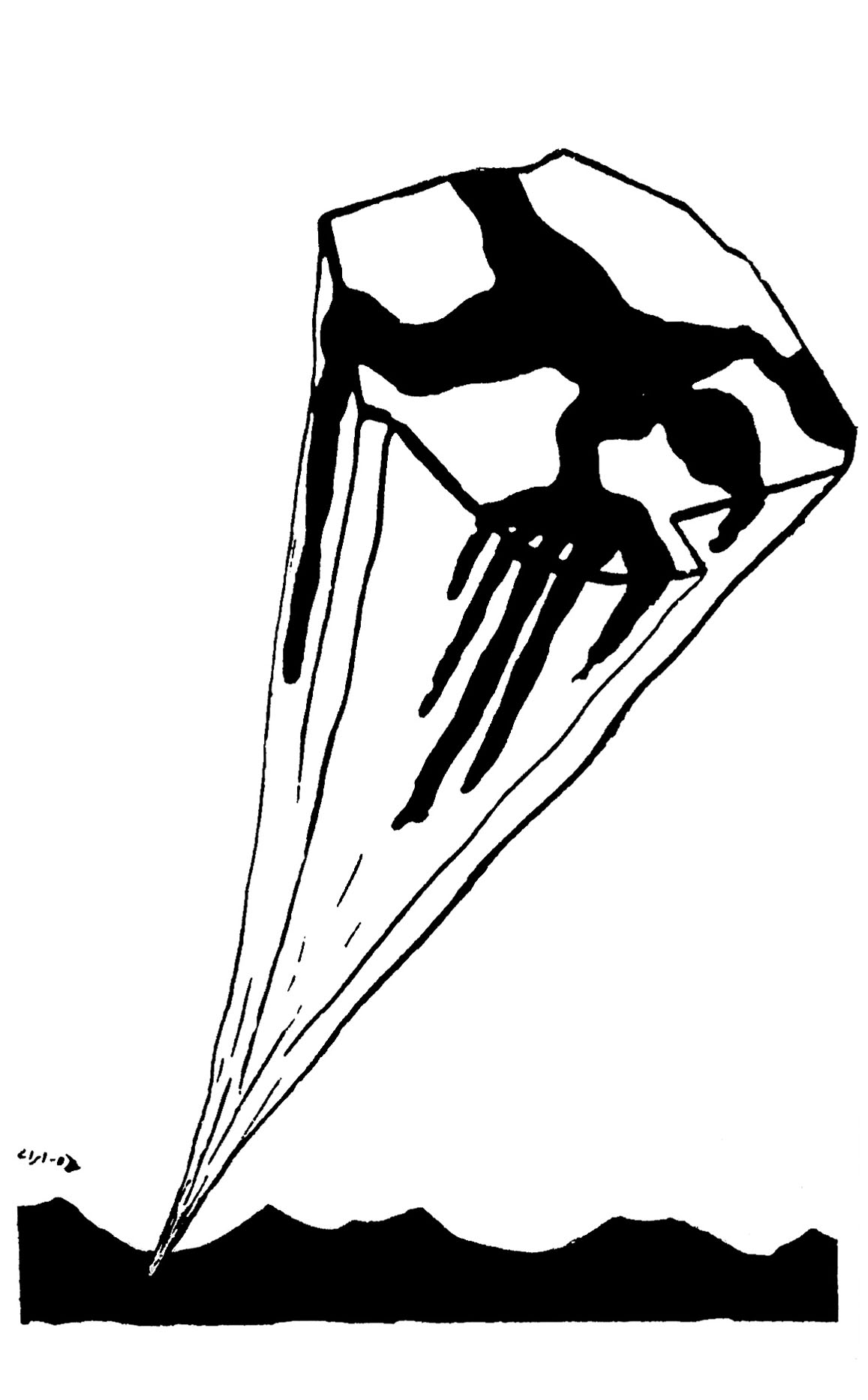

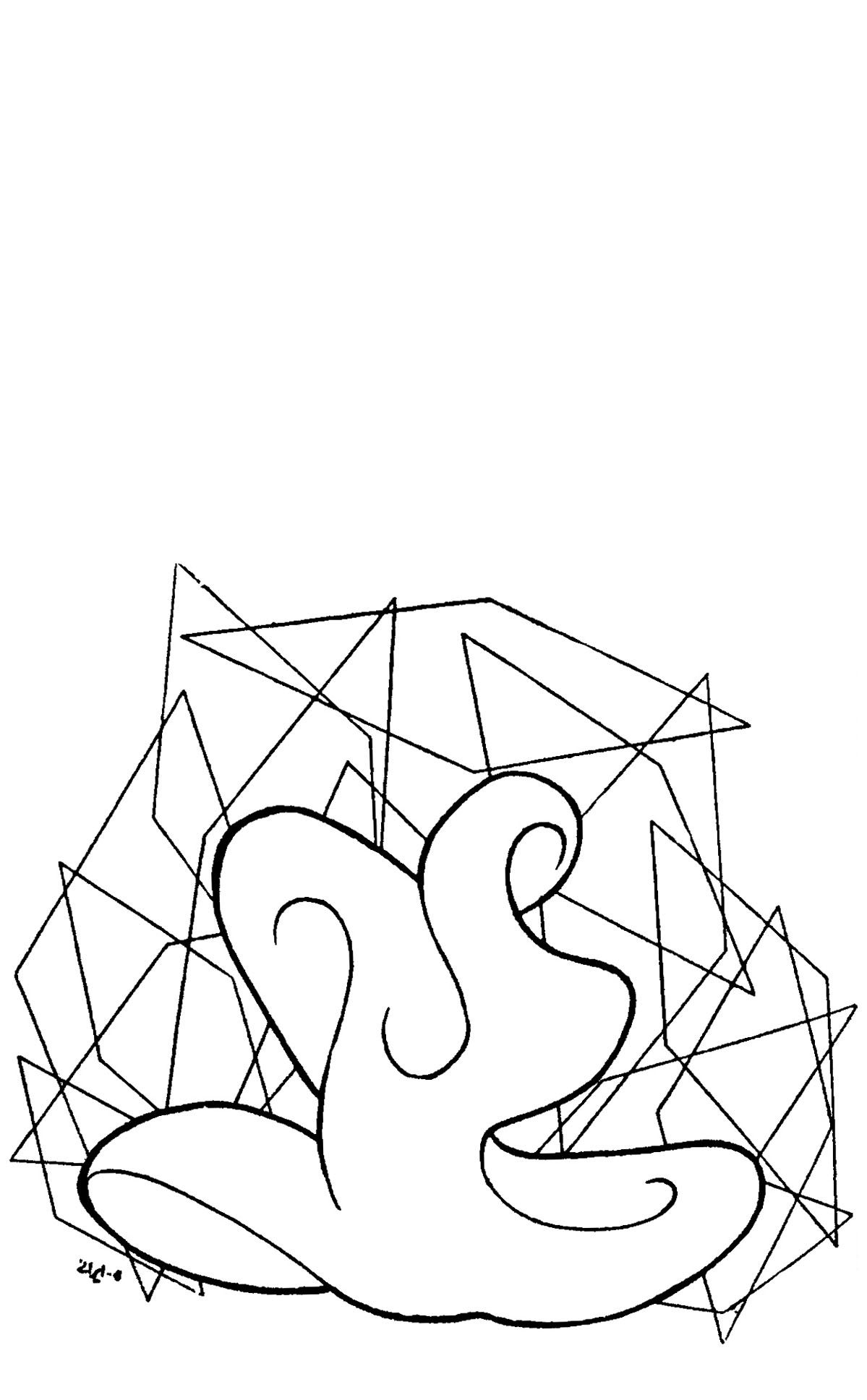

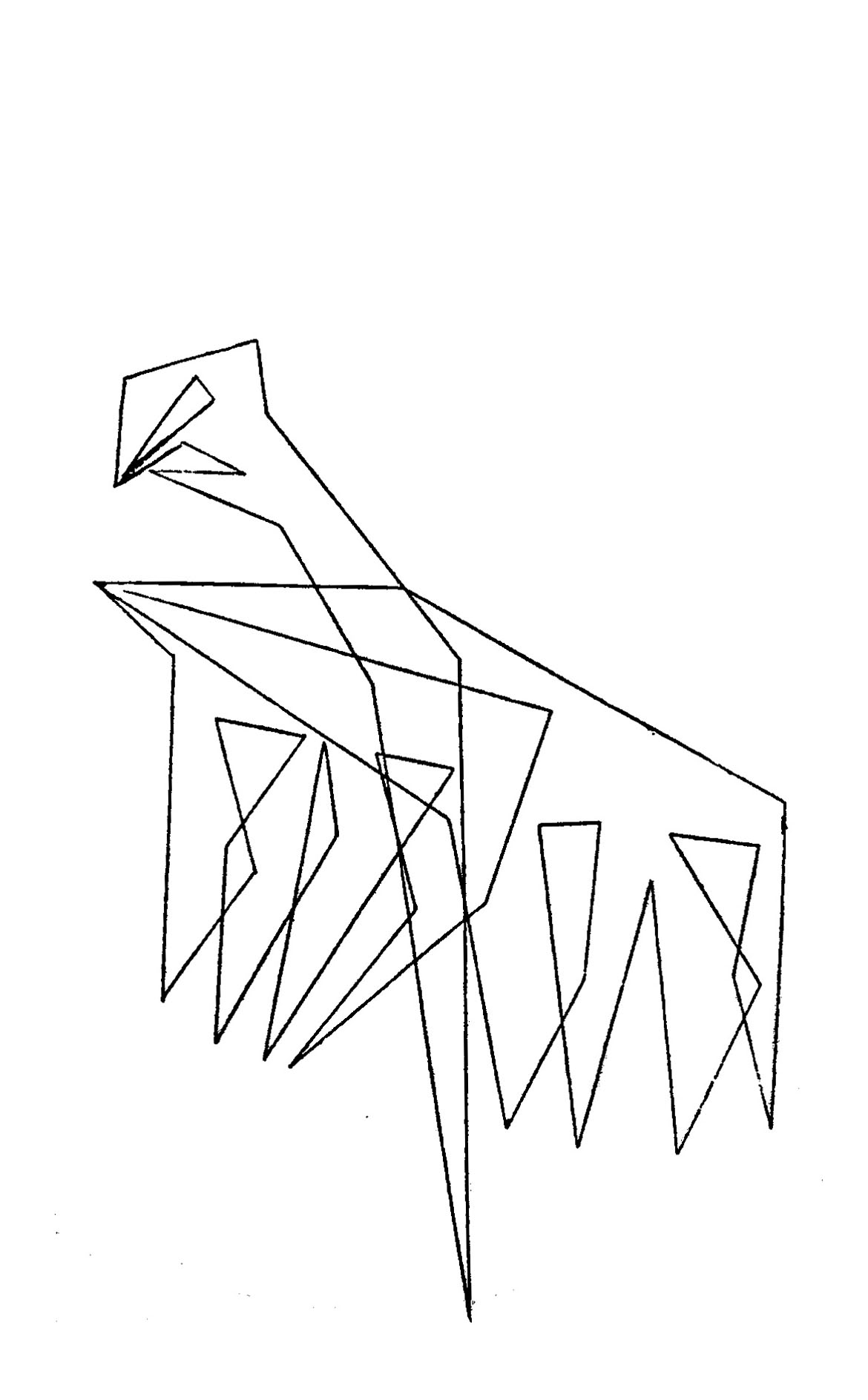

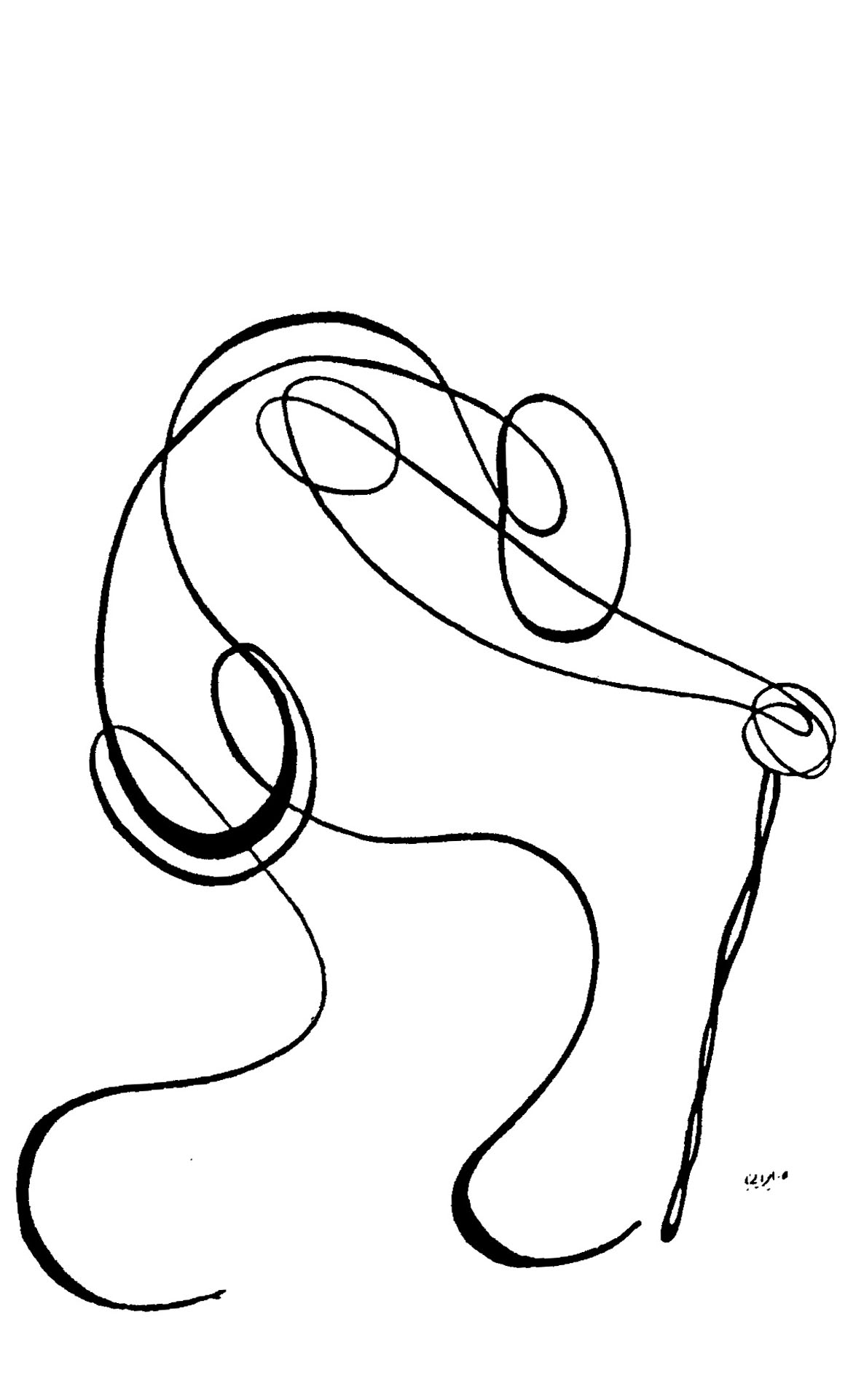

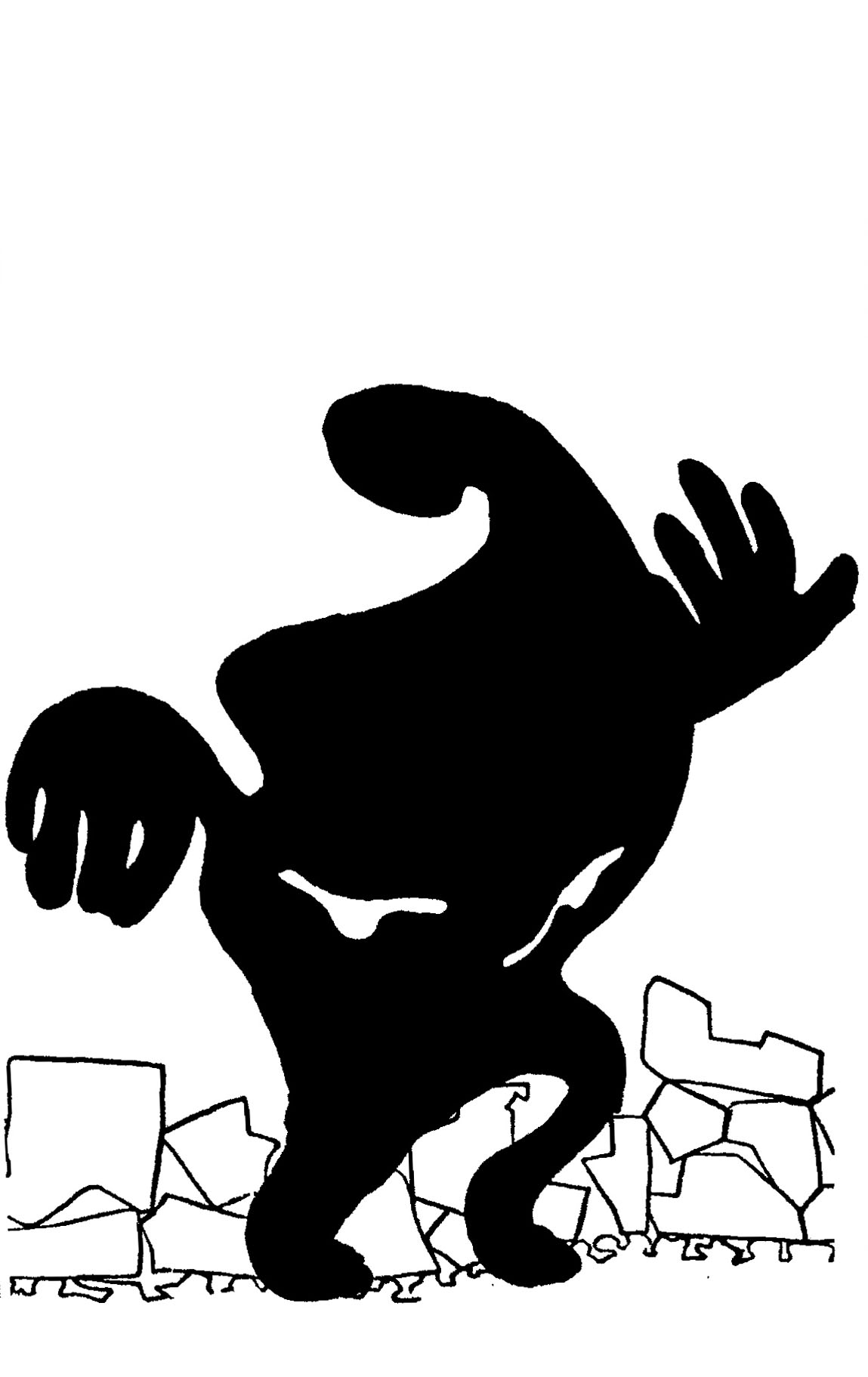

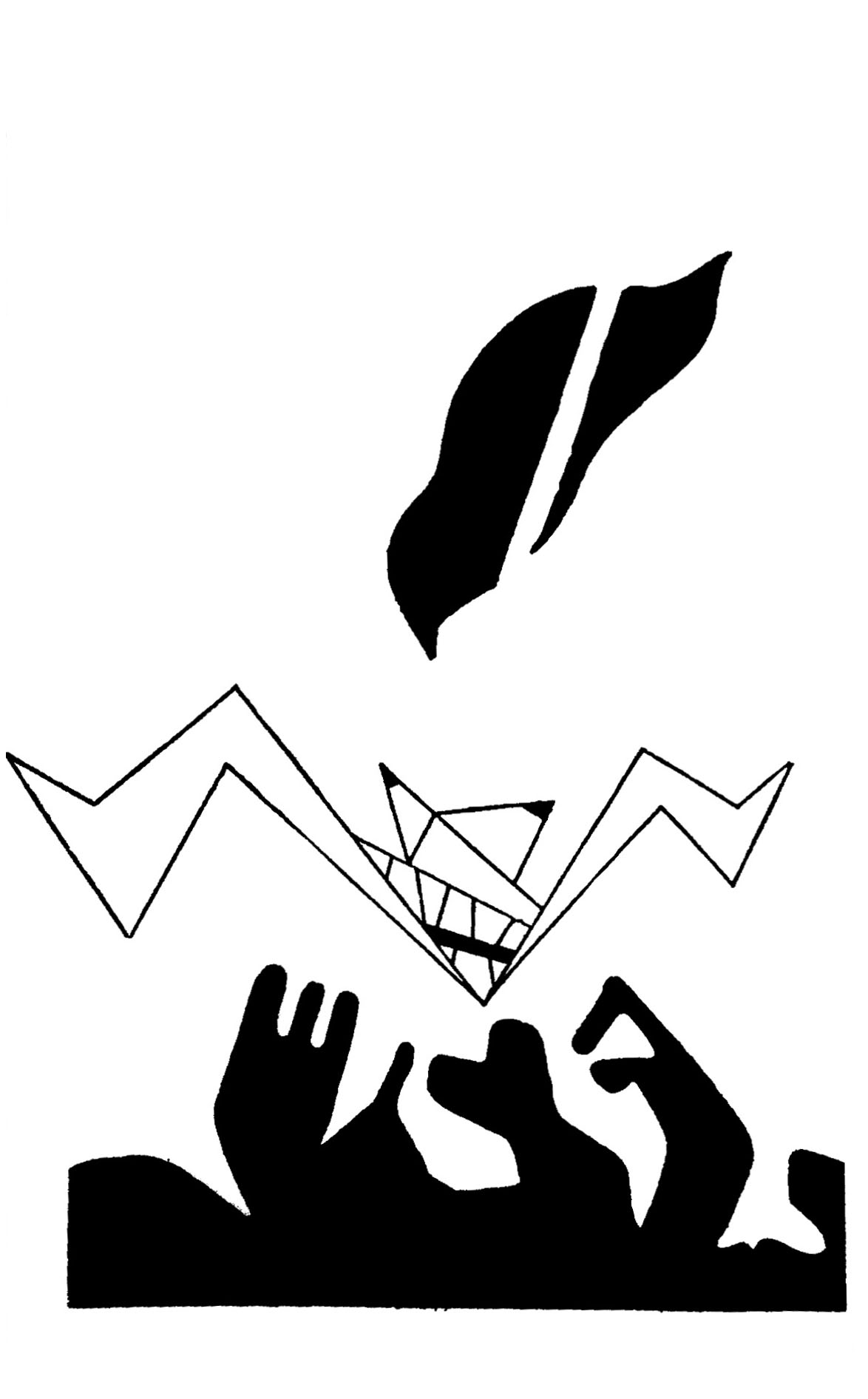

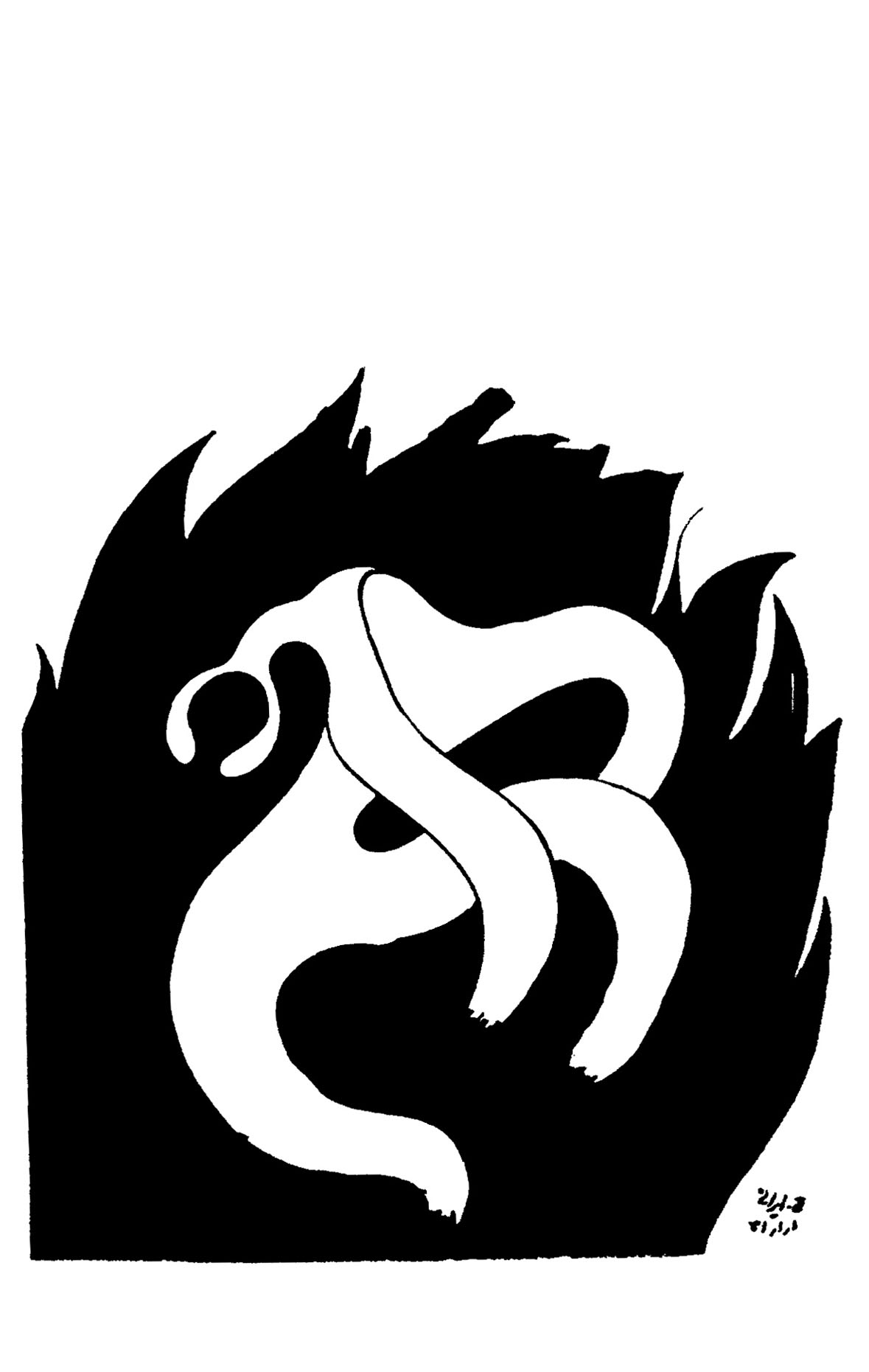

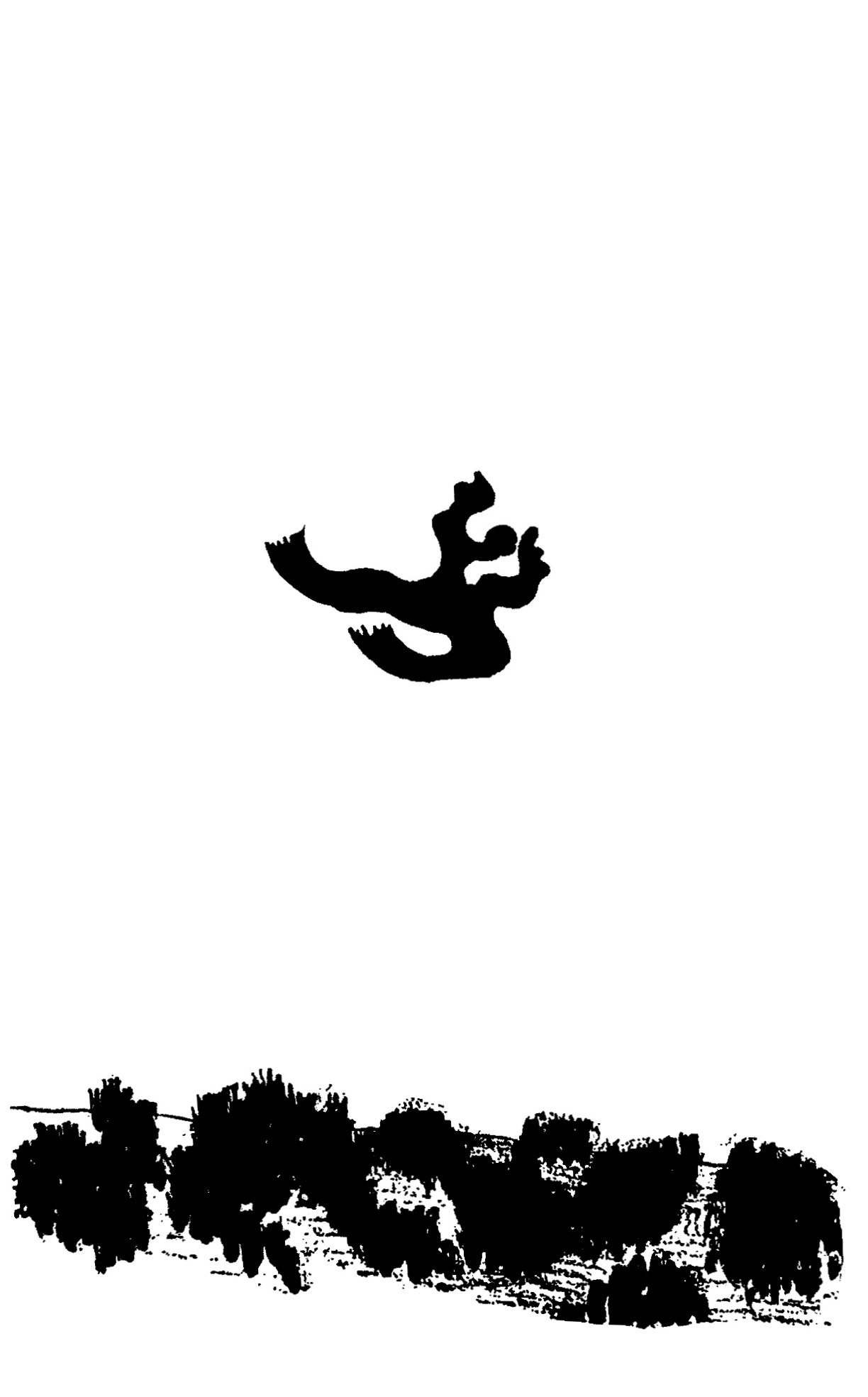

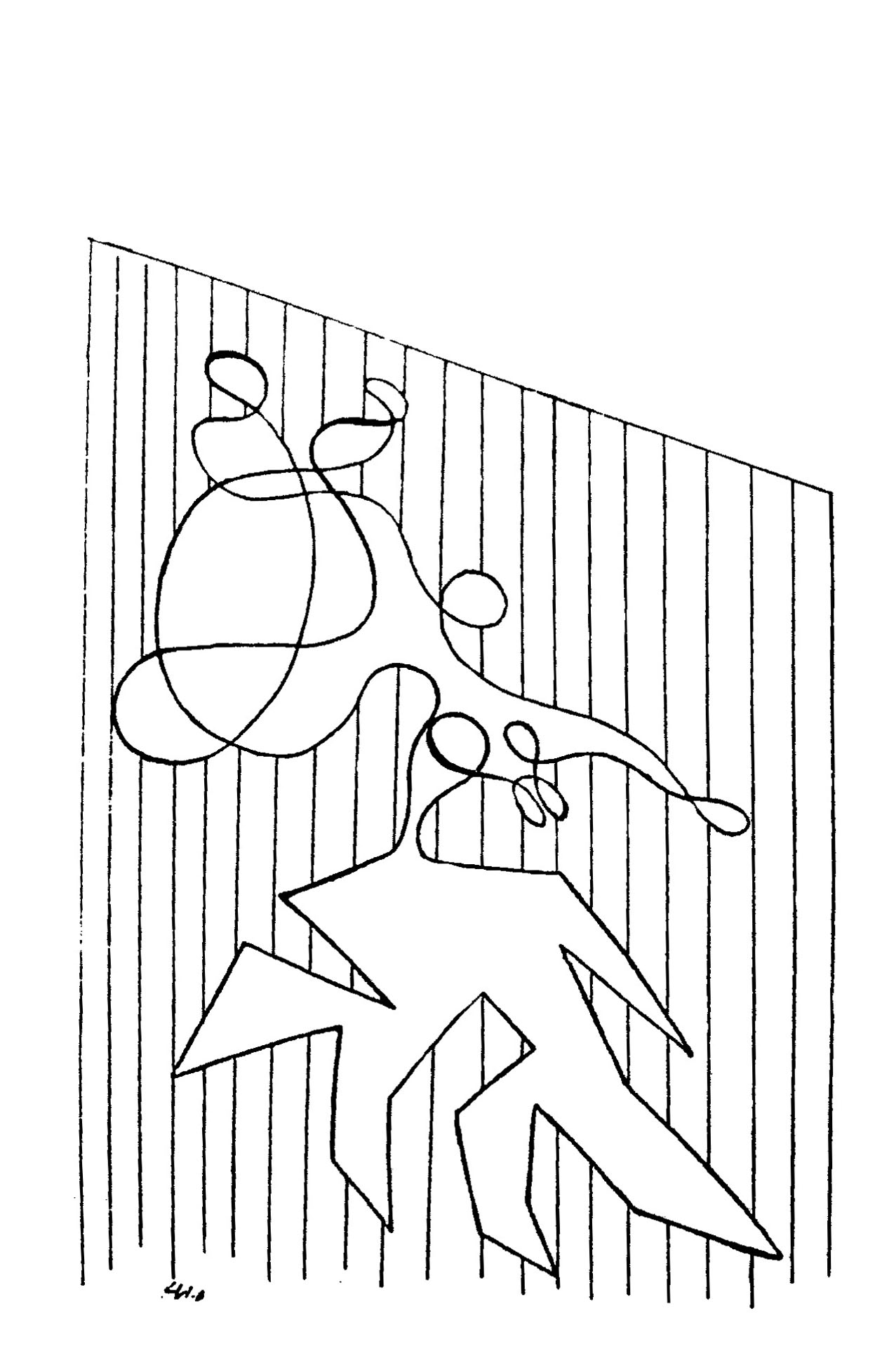

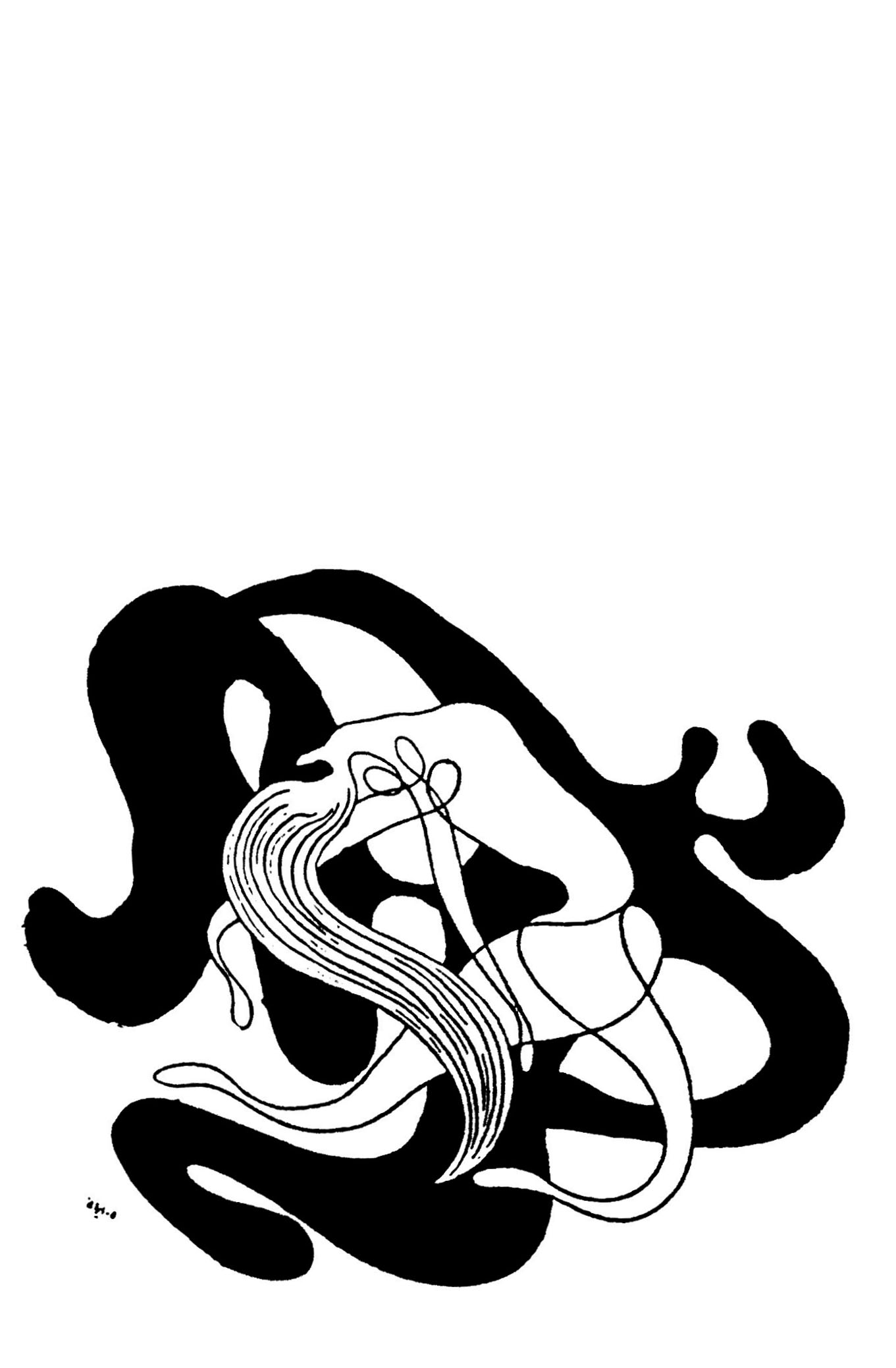

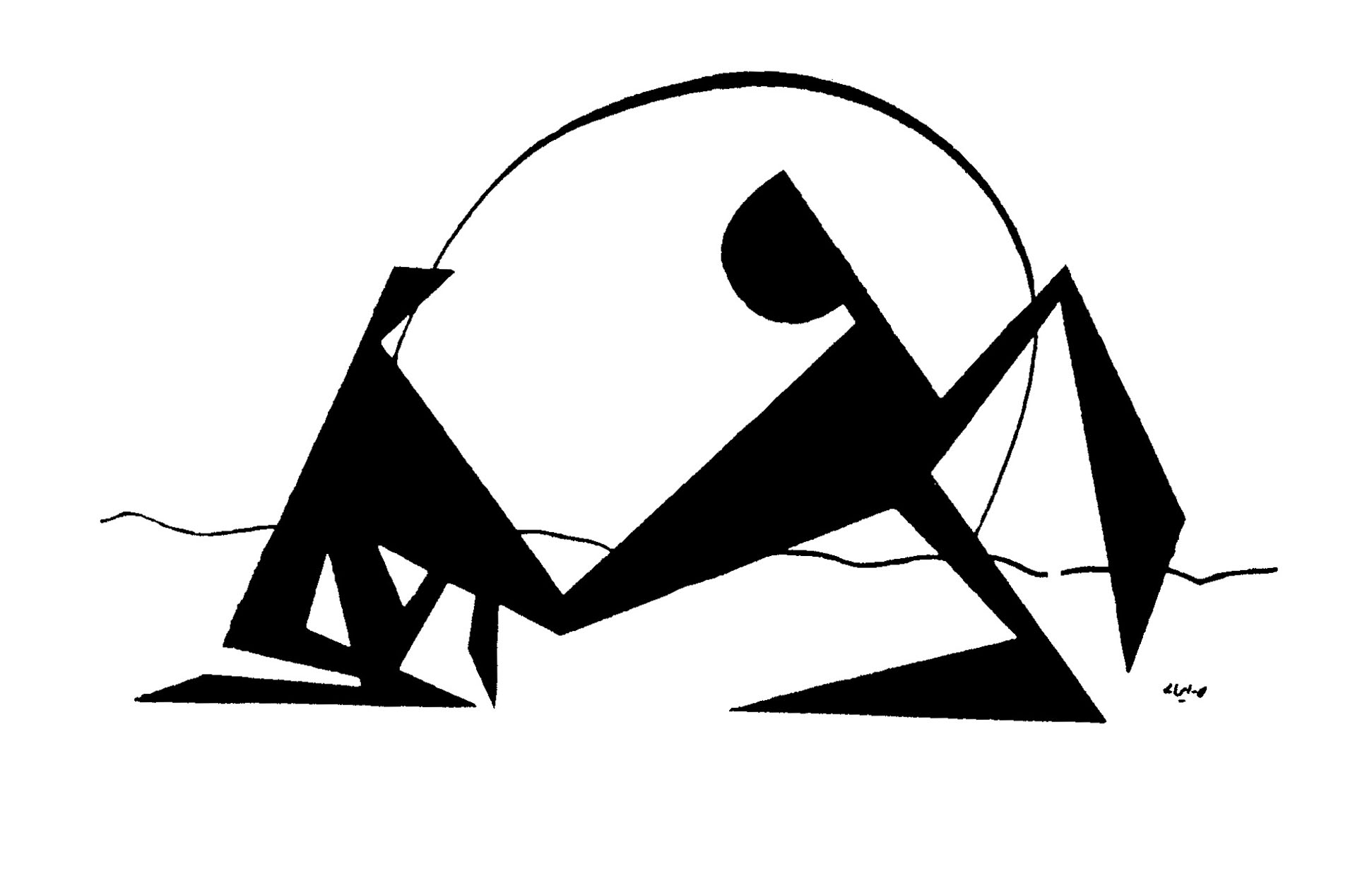

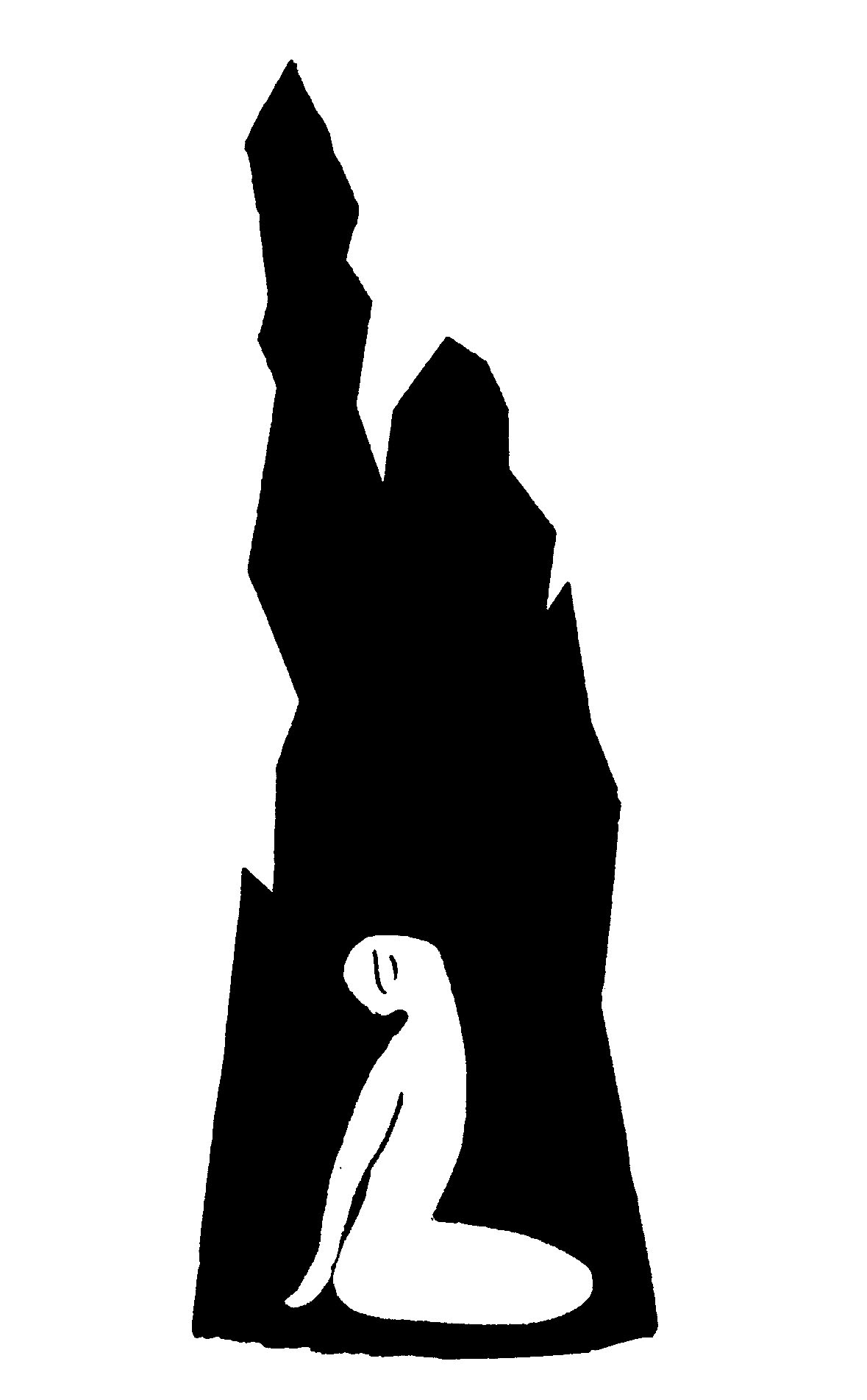
